= Grindlay family =

Anglo-Scottish knightly family

Grindlay
- Minor nobility and landed gentry
- Arms of Grindlay (Senior Branch): Quarterly, or and az, a cross quarterly erm. and of the first, betw. four pheons counterchanged of the field.
- Country: United Kingdom
- Earlier spellings: Gre(n)deley, Gren(e)ley(e), Gren(e)lay, Grynelay, Grenelie(s), Grenelaw(e), and others
- Etymology: Englisċ: "green / valley clearing"
- Origin: Kingdom of Northumbria
- Founded: c.850; 1176 years ago
- Founder: Hereweald and Æðel of Grēneleāh / Gryndeleā
- Titles: Baronets, Knights, Manorial Lords (Lairds)
- Motto: Non Degener (Not Degenerate)
- Estate: Various (see Houses and estates)
- Branches: List: Grindlay of Balsall Heath, Bordesley, and Edgbaston; Grindlay of Clarborough and Carlton-in-Lindrick; Grindlay of Greenlaw, Haltwhistle, and Corstorphine; Grindlay of Northill; Grindlay of Malpas and Stowe-by-Chartley; Grindlay of Ticehurst

The Grindlay family (Old English: [compound] Grēne/Grynde + Leāh/Leā) is an Anglo-Scottish knightly family of medieval origin.

Among the oldest landed families in Great Britain, it now has two primary branches, one in the English Midlands and the other in the former Scottish Marches, with a small presence in Ireland, North America, Australasia, and South Africa. The family established themselves as landed lords, knights, and gentry, but more recently were prominent British bankers (see Grindlays Bank), officials, industrialists, soldiers, and freemasons during the 18th, 19th and 20th centuries.

As an armigerous family whose position arose from feudal manorial lordships and knightly service, the Grindlay family rank among the British minor nobility or noblesse d'épée.

== Etymology ==
Grindlay is a toponymic surname arising from the combination of the Anglo-Saxon words grēne or grynde and leāh or leā, meaning "green clearing" or "valley clearing". Traditionally held to have arisen in Northumbria, modern scholarship suggests the name may instead derive from medieval woodland clearance in the former Forest of Arden in the English Midlands,^{[a]} before later spreading northward with the family.

== History ==
=== Origins ===
The family are reputed to be descended from the Anglo-Saxon thegns,^{[b]} Hereweald (Harold) and Æðel (Æthel or Adel) of Grēneleāh or Gryndeleā (c.850), transliterated as Greenlee or Greenley, of northern Northumbria. The surname is of territorial origin and historically attributed to either the ancient village of Grinnla, now Greenlaw in the Scottish Borders, or the medieval hamlet of Greenley near Haltwhistle in Northumberland, both formerly of the Kingdom of Northumbria.

According to records gathered by James Watt Jr. of Aston Hall in Birmingham and attested by John Thorpe of Duddeston Manor, the brothers were awarded the demesne of "Balsal Chase" recorded as Bordeshale or Bordeslea, now Balsall Heath and Bordesley, in Warwickshire and its manors by King Alfred the Great for "heroic gallantry" during the Norfolk Campaign against the Danes. Control of these lands and the surrounding region in northern Warwickshire, the then Kingdom of Mercia, established the family in the Midland counties in addition to the North of England and the Scottish Lowlands. Their kin who remained in the north, are considered to have largely become part of the wider lowland clanship of Home and Wedderburn.

"Of an ancient family "thorough Anglo Saxon" named Greenlee, called in the Midland Counties of England "The Greenlees"...two knights of this family...were gifted by King Alfred to a demesne in the County of Warwick...where this branch lived in opulence and high respect" – Archives of Aston Hall, Warwickshire

Some modern historians trace the surname to a small cluster of settlements in the English Midlands,^{[c]} namely Grindley in Staffordshire, Grindley Brook and Tushingham cum Grindley on the Shropshire and Cheshire border, and Little Gringley in Nottinghamshire. Professor Patrick Hanks, instead suggests the family took their name from their lands in central England, where by the mid 11th century, the Warwickshire line of the family held territories across the county, centred around Bordeshale Manor, over which they held lordship into the Late Middle Ages as the resident Lords of Bordeshale (see Bordesley Hall).

After the Norman Conquest, the family became vassals of Ansculf de Picquigny, and Robert de Beaumont, when they were granted numerous manors across the English Midlands by William the Conqueror. Although some of the lands awarded included areas held by the family prior to 1066, they continued as manorial lords of many of their ancestral estates, holding them in fief or knight's fee in return for homage and fealty to their Norman overlords as tenants-in-chief. This arrangement is evident in the Domesday Book, which shows the family continuing to hold lands after 1086,^{[d]} primarily throughout the Coleshill Hundred of Warwickshire, and the medieval Book of Fees, which records the family paying scutage for their "old feffment" held on behalf of Roger de Somery, the feudal baron of Dudley and descendant of de Picquigny.

=== 13th, 14th, and 15th centuries ===
By the High Medieval Period, the English branch of the family were established landowners of the English Midlands, primarily in Warwickshire and Staffordshire, and later in Nottinghamshire and southern Cheshire. The spelling of the family name developed several variants over time, principally Greneleye, Grenlay and Grendleye or Grendeley. This is exemplified by the different ways the surname was recorded throughout this period, including William de Grenelega (c.1180), Simone de Greneleye or Greneley (c.1250), William de Grenlay (c.1275), and Richard de Grendeley or Grindley (c.1390).

They were involved in regional affairs of politics and governance as early as the 13th century onwards, and as one of the prominent landed families of the region, they appear regularly in the medieval records of the English Chancery and Exchequer, namely the Pipe, Fine, Close, Plea, and Patent rolls and escheats, regarding awards of lands and estates, collection of levies, legal disputes, and grants of office and position. Such instances include Hugh de Greneley (c.1289) of Carlton in Lindrick Manor, officiator for the abbot of Welbeck Abbey, Geoffrey de Greneleye or Grenleye,^{[e]} and his son Sir William de Greneley or Grenleye (c.1328), a knight or man-at-arms, wardens of the peace, knights of the shire, and witnesses, warrantors, and seal signatories for the Chartulary of the Priory of St. Thomas near Stafford, Thomas de Grenlay (c.1349), incumbent Rector of St John the Baptist Church, Clarborough, John de Grenlay or Grenley (c.1405), Crown Coroner of Nottinghamshire, Thomas Grenley or Greneley (c.1424),^{[f]} twice Vice Chancellor of Oxford University in 1436 and 1437, and Thomas de Greneley (c.1440), simultaneously the Lord of the Manor of Northill Rectory, Master of the College of Northill, and Parson of the Church of St Mary the Virgin following the death of Sir John Tailly and his son. He and his successors held the lordship, and a knight's fee in Tempsford, until the college was eventually dissolved in 1547 following the dissolution of the monasteries by King Edward VI, and subsequently bequeathed to Sir William Fitzwilliam in 1549.

The Middle Ages saw several generations of the family take up arms against the French during the Hundred Years' War, primarily beside the noble Midland families of Beauchamp, Beaufort, and Talbot, and spanning at least 70 years of the conflict. The first recorded was Sir William de Grenlay, William Greneleye, or Guillaume Greenlee (c.1372) of Edgbaston, Warwickshire, who, with his soldiers, fought alongside John Neville, 3rd Baron Neville and Thomas Beauchamp, 12th Earl of Warwick, but was slain at the first siege of Harfleur in 1415, and posthumously commended by King Henry V. His kinsmen, John Grenlay, Grenley or Greneley (c.1417), was also at the siege under the command of Thomas Beaufort, Duke of Exeter, and subsequently garrisoned at Harfleur until it fell to the French in 1435, and Thomas de Grenlay or Greynley (c. 1430), a man-at-arms mustered at Port-de-l'Arche, fought against the incursions of Étienne de Vignolles into the Basse Seine Valley during 1430, and at the siege of Louviers in 1431.

In the latter stages of the war with France, the family fought as part of the company of John Talbot, 1st Earl of Shrewsbury, and his second, John Beaufort, 1st Duke of Somerset, most notably Stephen Gredeley, Gredley or Greddelay (c.1440) and his brother Thomas de Gredelay or Grynnelay (c.1441). Stephen fought with the Earl of Shrewsbury during his campaign to reclaim Pays de Caux throughout the late 1430s, continuing as part of his close military affinity during the relief of Harfleur in 1440, and the sieges of Pontoise, Conches-en-Ouche, and Louviers in 1441. Thomas saw fighting alongside his brother at Conches-en-Ouche and Louviers, was detached to the garrison of Rouen to oversee the escorting of supplies to Sir William Peyto and his forces during the siege of Dieppe in 1442, before joining the Duke of Somerset for the Cherbourg offensive in the summer of 1443. Another relative, Robin Grynelay (c.1442), saw fighting at Le Neubourg under Henry Bourchier, 1st Earl of Essex until it was lost to the French in April 1444.

During this same period, a cadet branch of the English arm of the family rose to prominence under Sir William Gyrdeley, Gridley, or Grindlay (c.1415), a wealthy lancer,^{[g]} who fought at the siege of Harfleur and the Battle of Agincourt as a member of the personal retinue of John Holland, 2nd Duke of Exeter, the then Earl of Huntingdon, alongside Thomas Talbot, a relation of the Talbot Barons, and others. Seemingly of Boarzell Manor in Ticehurst, Sussex, in 1425 William granted a portion of his lands in East Sussex, as well as their tenements, rents, and services to his comrades in arms, the Duke of Exeter, Sir Thomas Echyngham, and others, following their return from the wars in France. Although William and this branch of the family had amassed a sizeable estate in and around Ticehurst, having been in the area since at least the 13th century, his widow later sold the manor and most of the remaining lands to the knightly Roberts family of Glassenbury, Cranbrook, in 1459 and 1460. However, later generations evidently remained influential with John Greneley (c.1495) made a Commissioner of the King's Peace under King Henry VIII in February 1509,^{[h]} alongside other Sussex patricians including Thomas Fitzalan, 10th Earl of Arundel, Thomas West, 9th Baron De La Warr, and Thomas Fiennes, 8th Baron Dacre. The 1524 Sussex Subsidy Rolls list John, and his cousin Thomas, as prosperous taxpayers.

Throughout the late 13th, 14th, and 15th centuries, the family were engaged in a number of notable land ownership disputes with neighbouring families, including those of de Denston, Bagot, Barons of Bagot's Bromley, Ferrers,^{[i]} Earls of Derby, Legh,^{[j]} Cheshire and Warwickshire gentry and aristocracy and others, regarding their lands in Nottinghamshire and Staffordshire. The family also frequently acted as arbiters for issues of succession for several others, including the Lyot, Purley, and Wolaston (see William Wollaston) families of Staffordshire and Leicestershire.

=== 16th and 17th centuries ===
Around the early 16th century, part of the family moved south west into the neighbouring county of Herefordshire, where they established landholdings near Kington. In December 1513, John Greneley or Greneleye (c.1510) was made an acolyte to Richard Mayew, Bishop of Hereford by dimissory letter. Then in 1525, he and his heirs were granted the estate of Woodhallhill Manor in Staunton on Arrow, formerly spelt Stanton, and the country house remained the seat of his successors thereafter. This branch subsequently rose to eminence, both directly and through marriage, becoming senior military officers, members of parliament, Baronets (see Coffin-Greenly Baronets), and Sheriffs of Herefordshire, as well as lords of various other manors across the county.

Towards the end of the reign of King Henry VIII, George Grenlegh or Grenley (c.1539) became part of the executive of the Lordship of Ireland, acting as agent to Leonard Grey, 1st Viscount Grane, the Lord Deputy of Ireland. Family involvement in Ireland grew, when in the mid 16th century, they were granted additional lands and estates, near the city of Limerick, Munster, by Queen Elizabeth I and Thomas Wentworth, 1st Baron Wentworth, the Lord Chamberlain, to establish various armouries for small arms and culverin cannon as part of the Tudor conquest of Ireland. As members of the "New English" class granted plantation lands on the border of the Earldom of Ormond, the family line that settled there supported the establishment of the Church of Ireland and the continued Anglicisation of the country. During the British Civil Wars in Ireland the family were loyal to the Crown as Protestant Royalists and remained so throughout the Protectorate and into the Restoration, typified by those such as John Grinley (c. 1635), a King's Royal Guardsman, who joined the company of Sir William Flower, the agent and informer of James Butler, 1st Duke of Ormond, in 1662. However, as committed Protestants, the family were increasingly subjected to religious persecution during the reign of King James VII and II, and their lands and hall were destroyed in response to the ongoing religious and monarchical turmoil of the 16th and 17th centuries, particularly that surrounding the Battle of the Boyne. The family were invited into the protection of Trevor Hill, 1st Viscount Hillsborough and Wills Hill, 1st Marquess of Downshire and member of parliament for Warwick, but largely decided to leave Ireland and emigrate to North America at the beginning of the 18th century.

Throughout the late 16th and 17th centuries, the family continued to expand their possessions,^{[k]} particularly in the North Midlands and Cheshire, where several areas are eponymously named, such as Grindleyes Feeld (c.1593) or Grindleys Green (c.1604), now Grindley Green in Newhall, Cheshire.

=== 18th, 19th and 20th centuries ===
The contemporary spellings of the family surname, themselves the result of further variation, are namely Grinley, Greenly, of Titley Court, and Grindley or Grindlay, of Parkfields Manor and others.

From the end of the 18th century onwards, the family actively participated in the French Revolutionary and Napoleonic Wars, the Industrial Revolution, the expansion of the British Empire, and the global conflicts of WWI and WWII, both civically and militarily. Their involvement included distinguished military service, the growth of the British financial system, wartime government leadership, and the development of pioneering industrial operations.

During the 19th and 20th centuries, a number of the family became prominent Freemasons, acting as members, officers, masters, and founders of multiple Masonic lodges across the country, but particularly in Warwickshire and the wider English Midlands.

Notable modern members of the English branch of the family include Capt. Robert Melville Grindlay,^{[l]} of the 7th Bombay Native Infantry, the soldier, painter, and founder of Grindlays Bank, Bvt. Maj. Henry Robert Grindlay, AQMG of the 21st Hussars, decorated officer of the First and Second Anglo-Sikh Wars, His Worship Alfred Robert Grindlay CBE JP, the founder of Grindlay Peerless and Lord Mayor of Coventry during WWII, Sqn Ldr. Dr. Robert Walter Guy Grindlay, of the RAF Medical Corps, WWII veteran, racing driver, and pioneering anaesthetist, Maj. Henry Hugh Grindley CBE, of the Royal Field Artillery, the overseas railway industrialist, William Harry Grindley JP, the 19th century ironstone magnate and founder of the eponymous W H Grindley, and Gwilym Cuthbert Grindley, the pioneering psychologist, patron, and founder of the Experimental Psychology Society.

== Wider family ==
=== Family branches ===
==== Scotland ====
Historically held to be descended from the same Northumbrian line as their English cousins, the Scottish branch of the family is similarly thought to have originated from either Greenlaw or Greenley in the Anglian Kingdom of Northumbria, and to have been early holders of what became the feudal Barony of Greenlaw before it merged with the Earldom of Lothian. The spelling of the family name, like the settlements,^{[m]} has since alternated between variants of Greenlee, Greenlaw, Grenlay, and Grindlay. The interchangeability of lee, lay and law in Scottish and northern spellings of the surname, particularly the medieval instances of Genelawe and Grenelay, and the congruity of their coats of arms, is illustrative of the familial connection.

The family is believed to have become a sept of Clan Home and Clan Wedderburn during the emergence of the Scottish clan system in the High Middle Ages owing to common ancestry, locality, and onomatology, with the arms of Grindlay and Wedderburn sharing the motto Non Degener (Not Degenerate). Some contemporary scholarship suggests that the family may in fact have settled in Scotland slightly later, during the 15th century, from the North Midlands, but were nevertheless established landowners and clergymen of the Scottish Lowlands by the 16th century, and closely affiliated with both clans.

The earliest recorded of this wider line was Sir Patrick de Greenlaw (c. 1150), a descendant of Cospatric I, the Earl of Northumbria. In the early 13th century, his son Sir William de Greenlaw or Grenlawa (c. 1180) became the progenitor of Clan Home when he adopted the surname following his acquisition of the lands of Home in Berwickshire. A century later William de Grenlawe or Genelawe of Edinburghshire (c. 1250) and his son Matheu (Matthew) de Grenlawe of Berwickshire (c. 1270) signed the Ragman Rolls,^{[n]} alongside other Scottish aristocracy, swearing fealty to King Edward I in 1296. Other notable medieval decedents include William de Grenlaw (c. 1320), Archdeacon of St. Andrews, Gilbert de Greenlaw, Grenlaw, or Grynlaw (c. 1360), first Canon and then Bishop of Aberdeen, and Lord Chancellor of Scotland under King Robert III, Thomas de Grenlaw or Grenlay (c. 1400), Vicar of Conveth and of Erth, Bailie of the Temple of Aberdeen, Burgess of Aberdeen, and Archdeacon of Lothian and of Orkney, Sir Alexander Grynlaw or Grynlay (c. 1457), chaplain to John Hay, 1st Lord Hay of Yester, and George de Greenlaw or Girnelaw (c. 1464), Commissioner for Haddington in the Parliament of Scotland.

During the 16th century, parts of the family lands in the Southern Uplands and Central Lowlands were impacted by the dispossession of property of the Catholic Church in Scotland during the Scottish Reformation. In 1561, the Privy Council of Scotland decreed that a third of the revenue from the lands (feus) and produce (teinds) of Sir John Grenelay (c.1540) Prebendary of Corstorphine, from his benefice of the prebend of Half Dalmahoy and Half Haltoune in Midlothion, were to be subjected to a levy as part of the reforms initiated in 1560 by John Knox and The First Book of Discipline. When he died in 1568, Sir John left these lands and others, including areas across the city of Edinburgh, to his heirs and successors, forming the basis of an expansive estate which was home to the family for the next 300 years.

A century later, following the Restoration, members of the family fought in the Covenanter rebellions against the increasing persecution of Presbyterians arising from sectarian struggles for control of the Church of Scotland, known as "The Killing Time". The most notable was William Grindlay or Grinlaw of Monklands (c. 1640), who in June 1679 fought with the Covenanter army at the Battle of Bothwell Bridge against the Scottish government troops of James Scott, Duke of Monmouth. The Covenanters were defeated, and William was taken captive and held in Covenanters' Prison near Greyfriars Kirkyard. He was one of the few prisoners to decline the offer of indemnity from King Charles II, repeatedly refusing not to take up arms again if released when interrogated by the High Court of Justiciary. Consequently, on 15 November he was put aboard the Crown of London in Leith for transportation to Virginia in the British Colonies, however he drowned on 10 December when the vessel was wrecked in a storm off the coast of Deerness, Orkney.

The 18th and 19th centuries saw the family establish numerous commercial enterprises, including expansive merchant shipping fleets, industrial leather manufacturing, and large-scale grain and brewing businesses across the Scottish Lowlands and Northern England. The Grindlay Cowan line of the family, founded with the marriage of Jane Grindlay (b. 1778) and Walter Cowan (b. 1775), a relation of the Earls of Wigton and the Earls of Perth, in 1803, were major investors in real estate and the expansion of the railways in the 19th century.

More contemporary Scottish family members include George and William Grindlay,^{[o]} the 18th and 19th century leather magnates and landowners of the former Orchardfield Estate in Edinburgh, Capt. Thomas Grindlay of Marionville House, master of Trinity House of Leith, Walter Grindlay, the Edinburgh and Liverpool shipping grandee,^{[p]} and father of Lady Janet Grindlay Simpson,^{[q]} (see Simpson Baronets of Strathavon and Edinburgh), Lt. Alexander Brown Grindlay DCM MiD, of the Royal Army Medical Corps and 11th Royal Scots, Capt. Edward 'Teddy' Grindlay, of the 4th and 10th Scottish Rifles, close friend and patron of Sir Herbert James Gunn, William 'Spread Eagle' Grinly, QM of the Royal Leith Volunteers, soldier, mariner, and merchant, and The Right Hon. Lord Grindley of Rannoch.

==== North America ====
Another branch of the family exists in North America following emigration from the United Kingdom during the 18th and 19th centuries. Notable members of the family in the United States and Canada include Bvt. Brig. Gen. James Glas Grindlay, the highly decorated Unionist officer of the American Civil War and Medal of Honor recipient, Dr. John H Grindlay, a combat surgeon with the United States army in Southeast Asia during WWII, the diary of whose experiences was later widely published, Isabella Grindlay, later Grindlay Jackson, an Anglo-Canadian member of the Women's Army Auxiliary Corps during WWI and acclaimed war poet, Thomas Maltby Grindley, the Anglo-Canadian merchant, soldier, and politician, and Jonathan Ellis Grindlay, a Harvard University astrophysicist.

==== Australasia ====
A small part of the family resides in Australia and New Zealand having relocated from the United Kingdom during the 19th and 20th centuries. Members of this branch include George William Grindley FRSNZ, the geologist and polar explorer after whom the Grindley Plateau is named, Rebekah Grindlay, an Australian diplomat and Ambassador to Lebanon, and Meihana Grindlay, a professional rugby union player.

=== Broader relations ===
The Grindal family (see Edmund Grindal, Archbishop of Canterbury during the 16th century)^{[r]} are held to be close associates and possible relations, with their near synonymous heraldry believed to stem from this connection. So too are the Gridley family (see Barons of Stockport), the evidence of whose decent is more ambiguous, due to the near interchangeable medieval spellings of the Grelley, Gresley and Grindlay families in the North Midlands.

Direct ancestral ties to both the noble Norman families of Grelley, formerly spelt Gredley, Greidley and Gredleye, decedents of Albertus Greslet or Albert 'd'Avranches' de Greslé (c.1050 – c.1100), avowed Viscount of Avranches, and the 1st Baron of Manchester (see House of Grailly), and Gresley, formerly spelt Greseleye, Baronets of Drakelow Hall and decedents of Robert de Stafford (see House of Tosny), have been presented by a number of 19th century historians, though are still the subject of research.

== Coats of arms ==
=== Senior branch ===
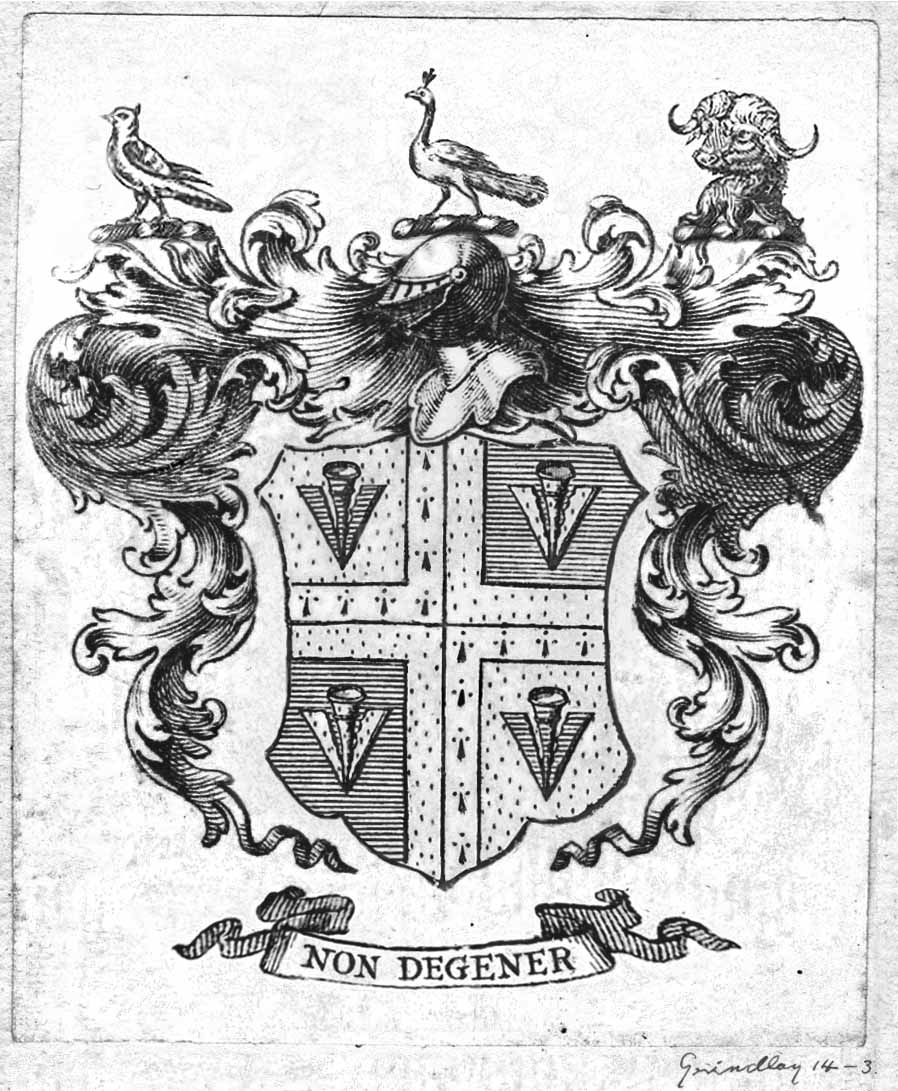
Armorial bearings of Grindlay. (18th century) Shield: Quarterly, or and azure, a cross quarterly ermine and of the first, between four pheons counterchanged of the field. Crest: A dove proper., a pea-hen proper., a buffalo's head erased gules. Motto: Non degener.

Although the family had been using seals and insignia from the beginning of the 14th century, the first known record of arms are seemingly from Sir William de Grenlay, William Greneleye, or Guillaume Greenlee (c.1372) of Edgebaston, Warwickshire, a "Knight of the Royal Guards" (see Yeoman of the Guard), who was commended for martial valour at the first siege of Harfleur in 1415, in Normandy, France, during the Hundred Years' War. William was killed storming the breach in the bastion walls alongside his soldiers, as he fought to secure the fortress gates during the final stages of the siege. Buried on the glacis where he was slain and with an oak sapling to mark his grave, William was posthumously honoured by King Henry V, and as a reward, William and the family were entitled to have their armorial bearings "topped by a green mound and plant of oak".^{[s]} The existing family coat of arms at that time was recorded as:

"Armorial Quartering...angular bars on the shield; the ermine, above Bar; and a square thereon..."

The "Armorial Quartering" refers to the division of the field into 4 square quarters, the "angular bars on the shield" to early pheons, and the "ermine, above Bar" to the tincture adjoining the central ordinaries, all of which are exhibited in the arms to this day. This 14th century emblazoned escutcheon is regarded as an early form of the arms now bourn by the Grindlay family, with the current coat of arms adopted at some point during the 16th or 17th century, to differentiate their immediate familial line from their wider ancestral lineage.

The arms of the related but distinct lines of the Grindlay family, are identifiable by their differing heraldic crests, which among them include a buffalo (Northumberland and Berwickshire), a peahen (Warwickshire and Staffordshire), and a dove.

Examples of the recorded arms of Grindlay and Grindley, illustrating their relatively fluid interchangeability up until the 19th century, are as follows:

- "Crest – a dove, proper." Deuchar, 1817
- "Crest – a buffalo's head erased, gules." Deuchar, 1817
- "Per cross, or and az. a cross quarterly, erm. and of the first, betw. four pheons counterchanged, of the field. Crest, a pea-hen ppr. Motto, non degener." Robson, 1830
- "Az. a cross betw. four pheons or. Crest, a buffalo's head erased gu." Robson, 1830
- "Per cross, or and az. a cross quarterly, erm. and of the first, betw. four pheons counterchanged, of the field. Crest, a pea-hen ppr. Motto, non degener." Burke & Burke, 1844
- "Az. a cross betw. four pheons or. Crest, a buffalo's head erased gu." Burke & Burke, 1844
- "Crest – A buffalo's head erased. gu., a dove ppr., a pea-hen ppr. Motto – Non degener" Fairbairn, 1860, 1905, 1911
- "A dove ppr., pea-hen, ppr, and a buffalo's head erased" Washbourne, 1882
- "A dove, ppr.; and another, a pea-hen, ppr." Elven, 1882
- "A buffalo's head erased, gu." Elven, 1882
- "A buffalo's head, erased, gu., a dove, ppr., a pea-hen, ppr." MacVeigh, 1883
- "Quarterly, or and az. a cross quarterly erm. and of the first, betw. four pheons counterchanged of the field. Crest – A pea-hen ppr. Motto – Non Degener" Burke, 1884
- "Az. a cross betw. four pheons or. Crest – a buffalo's head erased gu." Burke, 1884

=== Cadet branches ===
The Warwickshire line of the family gave rise to two separate cadet branches, one in Nottinghamshire and then a second in Sussex. Both cadet branches attained arms in their own right.

==== Nottinghamshire ====
Cadet arms of Grindlay of Nottinghamshire.^{[t]}

The Nottinghamshire cadet branch adopted arms as early as the 14th century, attributed to William, son of John de Grenleye (c.1374) of the County of Nottingham. First documented in the Catalogue of Seals of the Department of Manuscripts of the British Museum 1894, and later in the Dictionary of British Arms – Medieval Ordinary Vol I, the armorial bearings are described as:

"A bend bretessed, between three crescents"

Identified by Walter de Gray Birch, the arms were recovered from a gothic panel and described as dark red but indistinct in colour, indicative of a gules escutcheon and likely faded argent charges,^{[t]} due to the tendency for silver paint to oxidise and darken over time (see Tincture: Argent).

==== Sussex ====
Cadet arms of Grindlay of Sussex.^{[g]}

The arms of the Sussex cadet branch of the family were first recorded in Wriothesley's Chevrons (c.1525) by Sir Thomas Wriothesley, 1st Earl of Southampton (1505–1550). The armorial bearings are described in this and later works, including the Dictionary of British Arms – Medieval Ordinary Vol II, as:

"Azure a chevron engrailed argent between 3 fleurs de lis or"^{[g]}

The arms of this cadet branch illustrate a number of parallels with those of Clan Kinninmont of Kinninmoth near Fife in Scotland, an area where the Grindlay family are known to have settled. The close resemblance extends to the clan crest and badge which feature an oak tree or sprig of oak.

== Houses and estates ==
Notable family residences:

- Bordeshale Manor, Warwickshire (historic family seat – destroyed) (See Bordesley Hall)
- Parkfields Manor, Staffordshire
- Westcote Manor, Warwickshire
- Carleton-in-Lindrick Manor, Nottinghamshire
- Trinity House, Warwickshire
- Northill College Manor, Bedfordshire
- Woodhillhall Manor, Herefordshire
- Holly Lodge, Warwickshire
- Hoole Old Hall,^{[u]} Cheshire
- Boarzell Manor, Sussex
- Carshalton Manor,^{[v]} Surrey
- Rannoch Barracks, Perthshire
- Orchardfield Estate,^{[w]} Edinburgh
- Derwent Island House, Cumbria
- Marionville House, Edinburgh

Other prominent residences of the wider family:

- Titley Court, Herefordshire (primary residence of Greenly line)
- Strathavon Lodge, Edinburgh (primary residence of Grindlay Simpson line)
- Lagreach House, Perthshire (primary residence of Grindlay Cowan line)

Residences of broader relations:

- Cross Hill House and St Bees Manor,^{[x]} Cumbria (primary residences of Grindal line)
- Culwood House, Buckinghamshire (primary residence of Gridley line)

== Family tree ==
Traditional descent of the Grindlay family

Grēneleāh (Greenlee); Northumbria^{[y]}	Earl of Northumbria (Earl of Lothian); Northumbria
Grindlay (Grindley); Northumberland & Berwickshire	Greenlaw; Berwickshire
Grindal; Cumberland	Baronet Simpson (Grindlay-Simpson); Midlothian^{[q]}	Grindlay; Warwickshire & Staffordshire	Grindlay; Nottinghamshire^{[t]}	Grindlay; Sussex^{[g]}	Greenlees; Berwickshire^{[s]}	Earl of Home (Clan Home); Berwickshire
Grindall; Middlesex^{[z]}	Greenly; Herefordshire^{[aa]}	Baron Gridley; Herefordshire & Buckinghamshire^{[ab]}
Baronet; Coffin-Greenly; Herefordshire

*All contemporary spelling variants have been used where possible.

†This tree-chart may not display correctly on some phone or tablet devices.

== Gallery ==
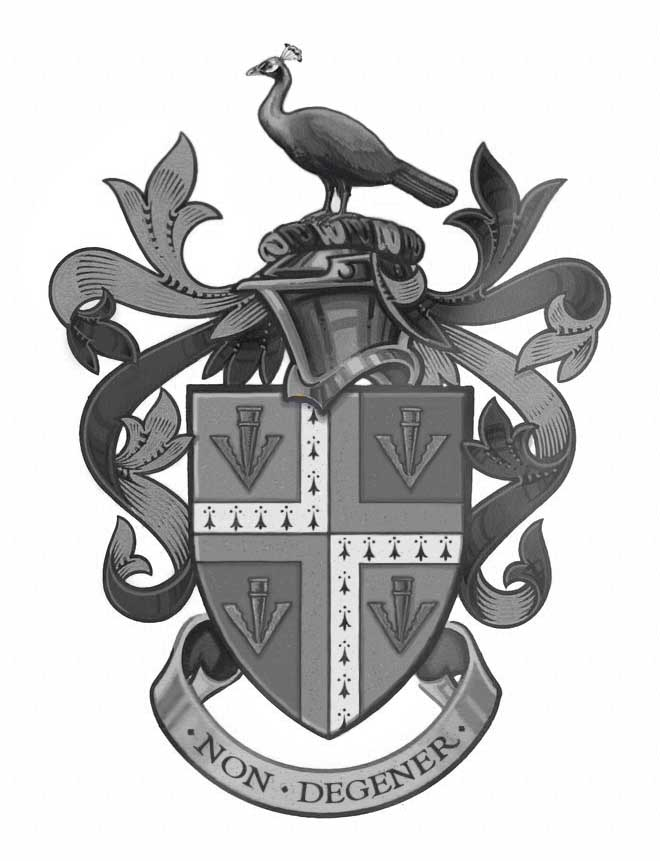
Undifferenced full heraldic achievement of the senior English branch of the Grindlay family (black & white image) (20th century).

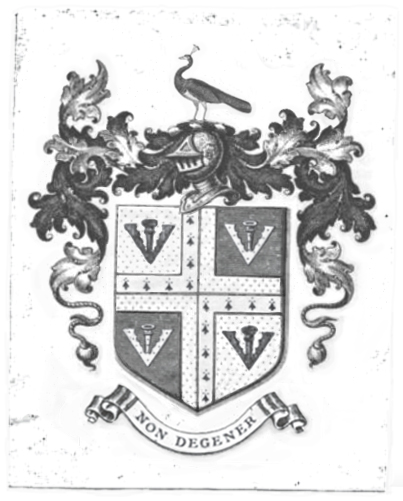
Arms of the Grindlay family of Warwickshire (19th century).

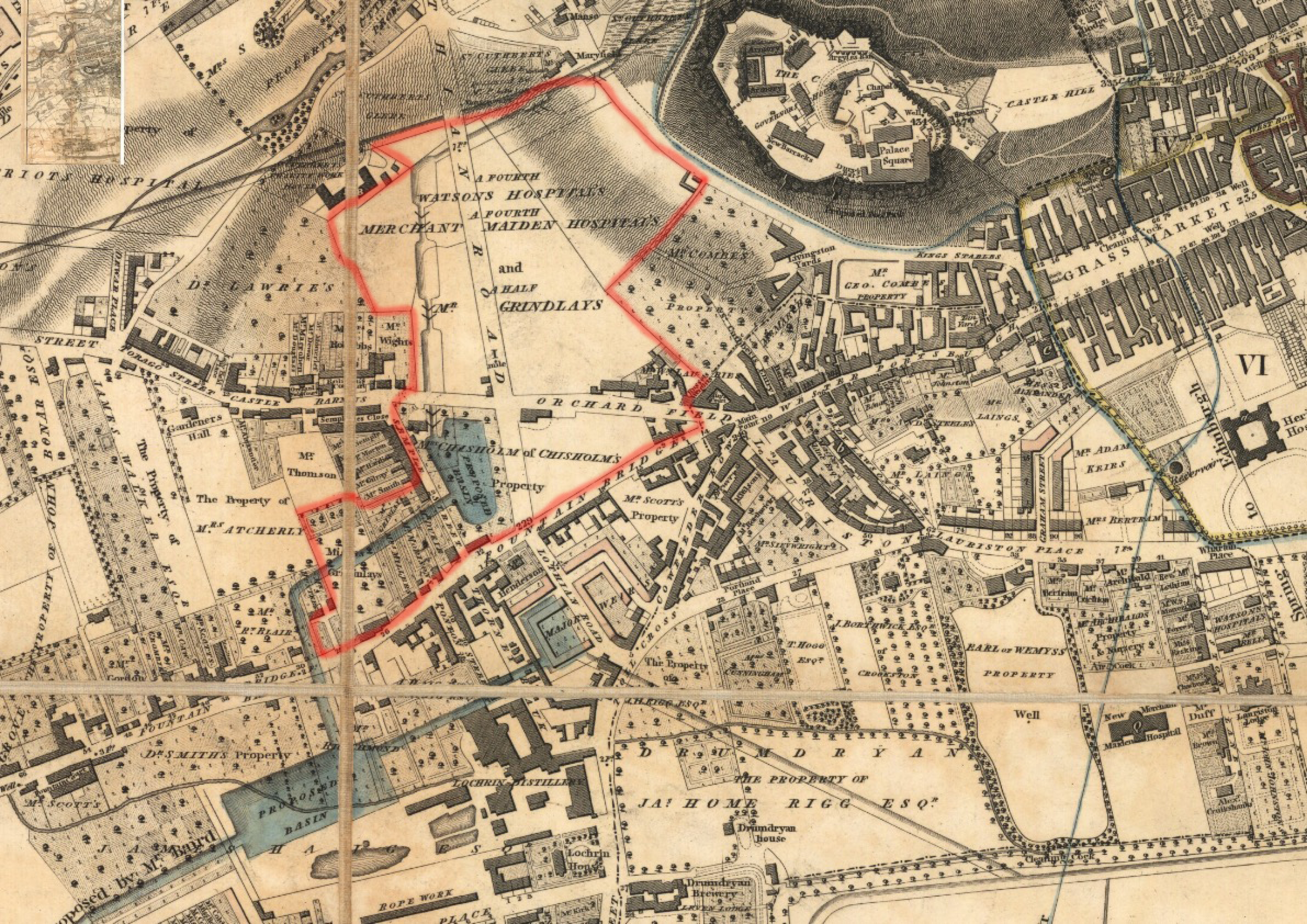
The extent of the Orchardfield Estate of the Grindlay family in central Edinburgh, Scotland (Illustrated on the 1817 map The City of Edinburgh and its environs. by Robert Kirkwood).

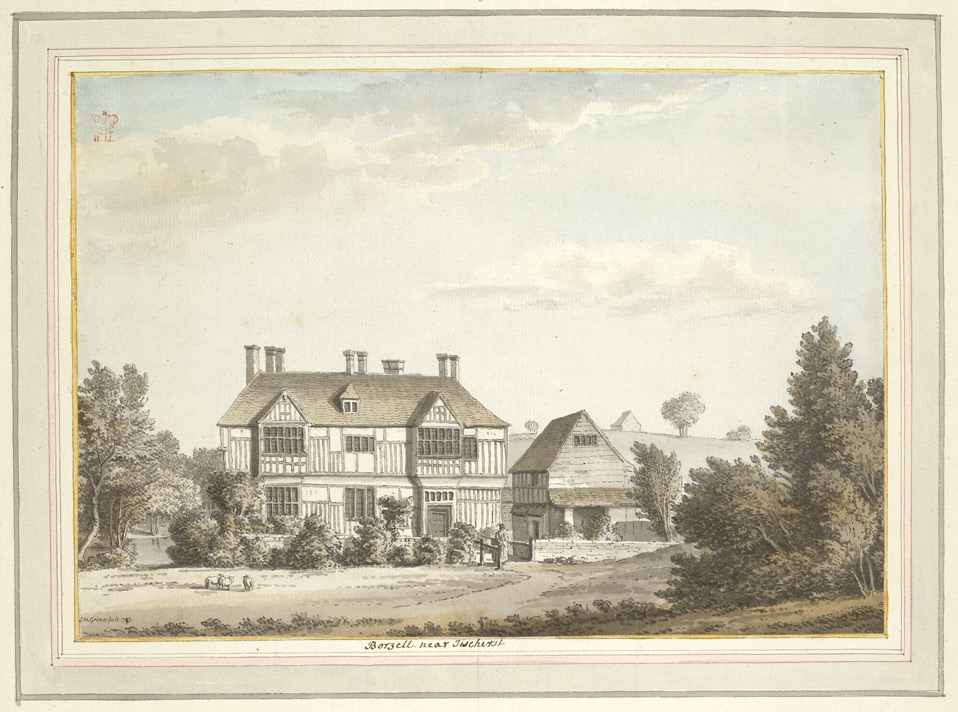
Boarzell Manor, one of the residences of the family during the Middle Ages and later home to the Roberts family, by S. H. Grimm.

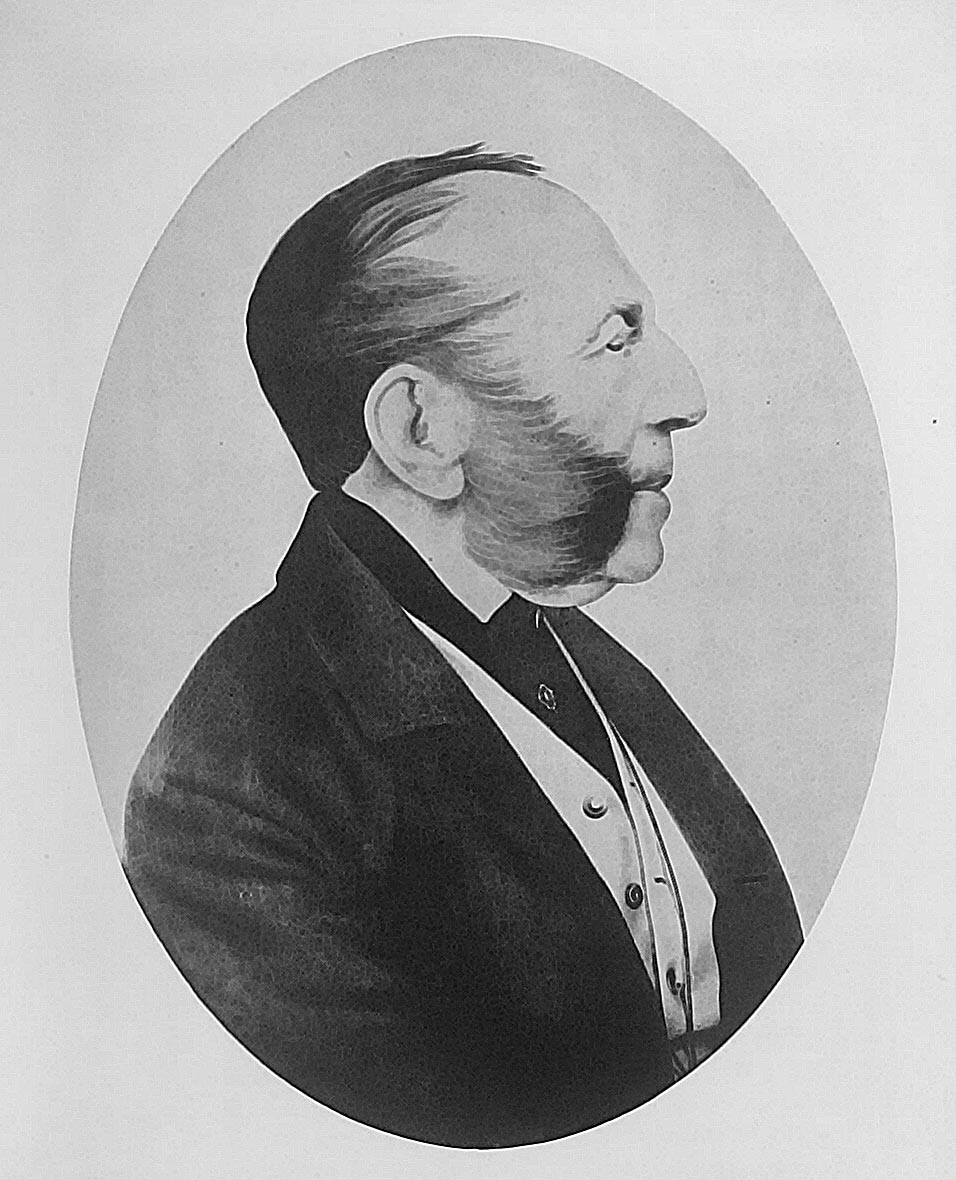
Captain Robert Melville Grindlay, the soldier, painter, and founder of Grindlays Bank (1830).

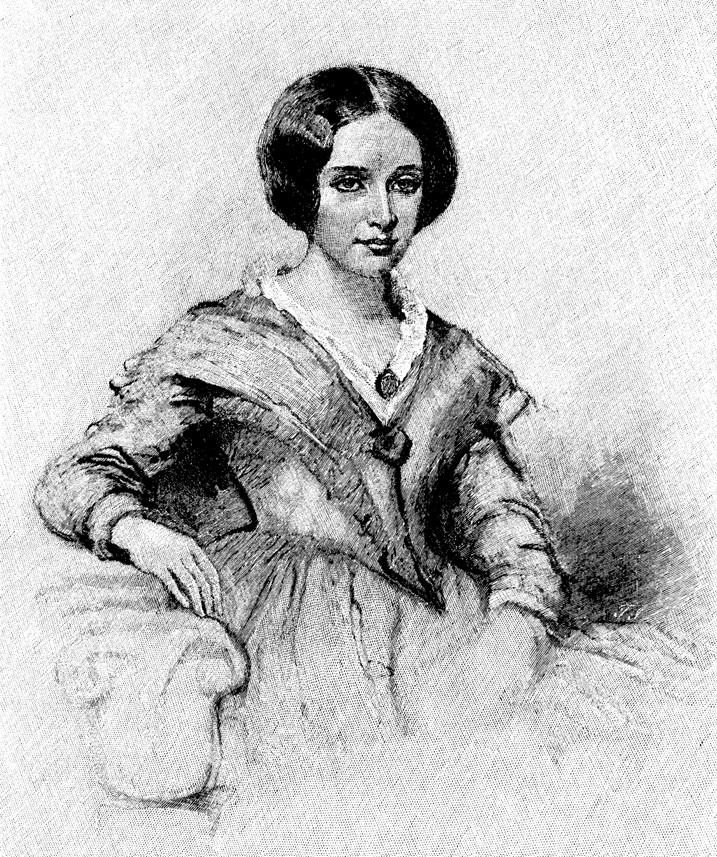
Janet 'Jessie' Grindlay, Lady Simpson by James Archer (1846)

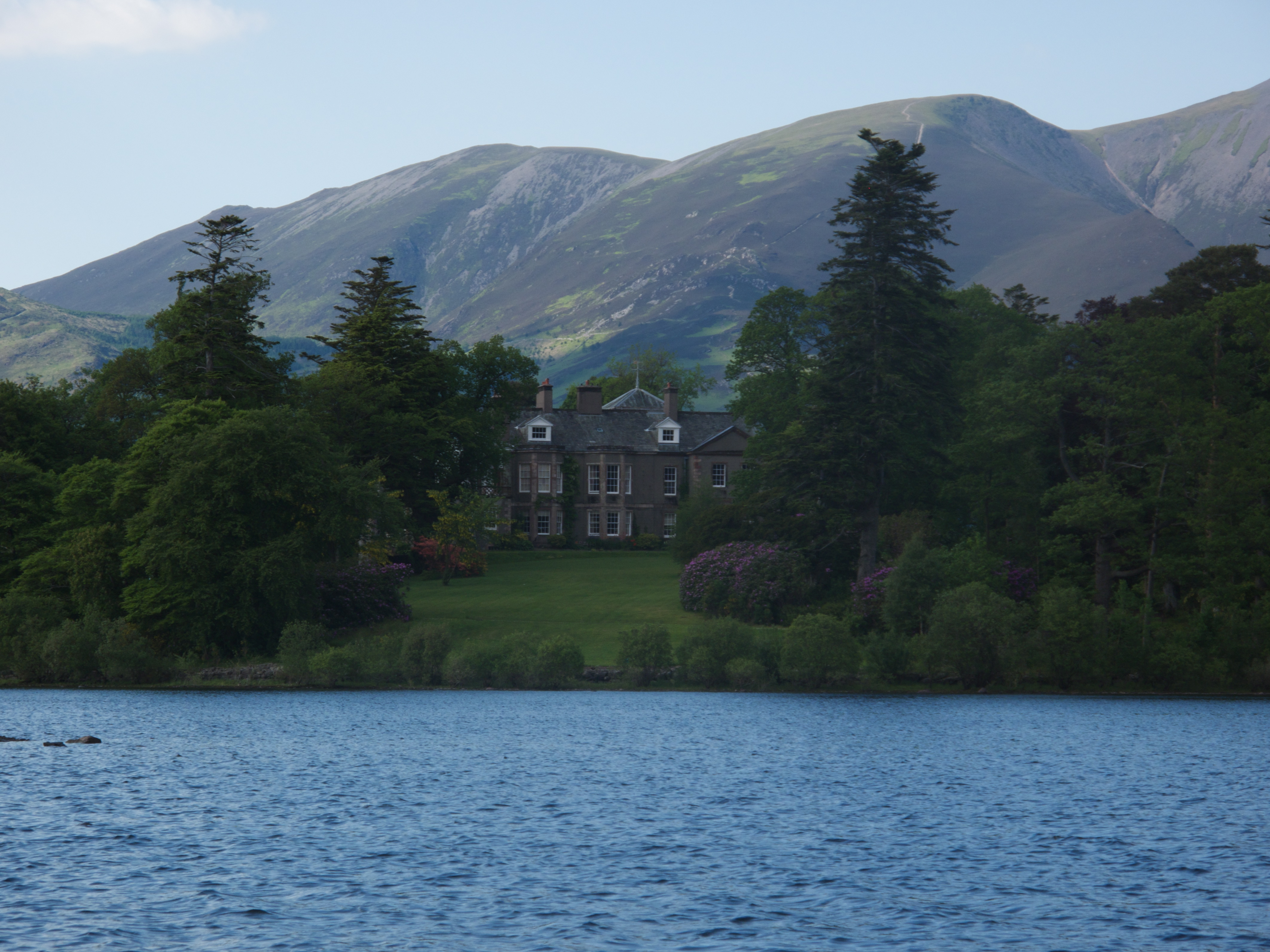
Derwent Island House, family country residence and primary summer home of Reginald Robert Grindlay.

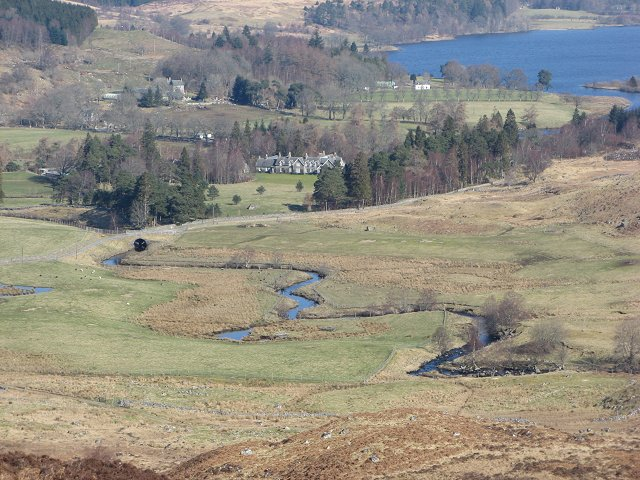
Rannoch Barracks, the residence of Lord Grindley during the 19th century and now home to Baron Pearson of Rannoch.

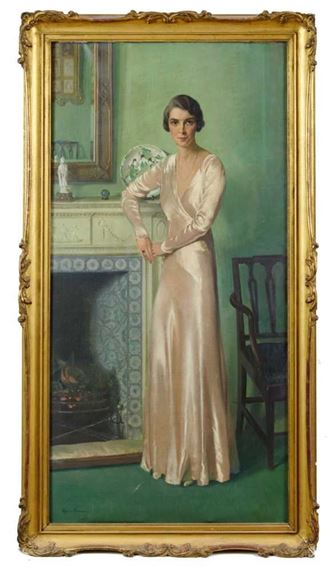
Mme Evelyn Mary Grindlay in the drawing room at Bedford Park by Sir Herbert James Gunn.

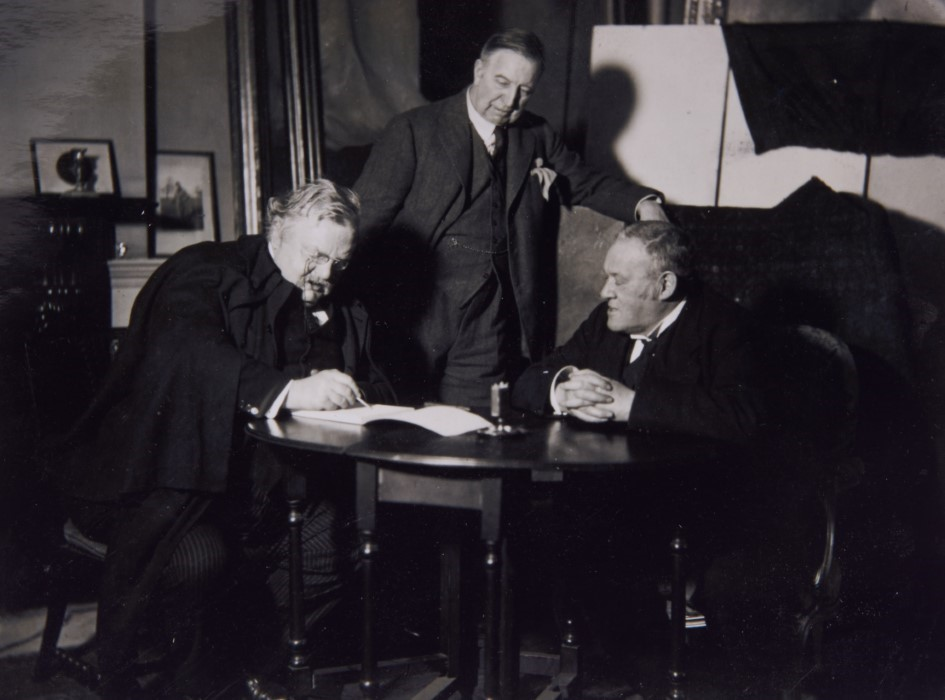
Captain Edward Grindlay, Hilaire Belloc and G. K. Chesterton by Paul Laib.

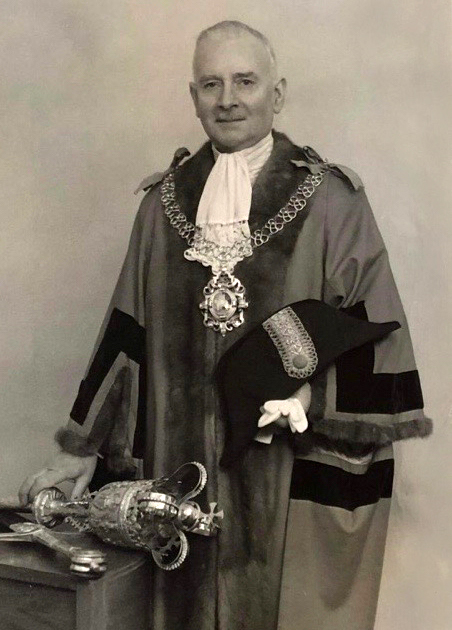
His Worship Alfred Robert Grindlay CBE JP, the Lord Mayor of Coventry during WWII and founder of Grindlay Peerless.

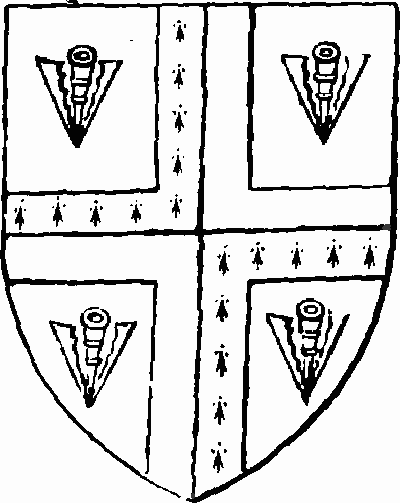
Escutcheon of the achievement of arms of Grindlay, senior branch (18th century).

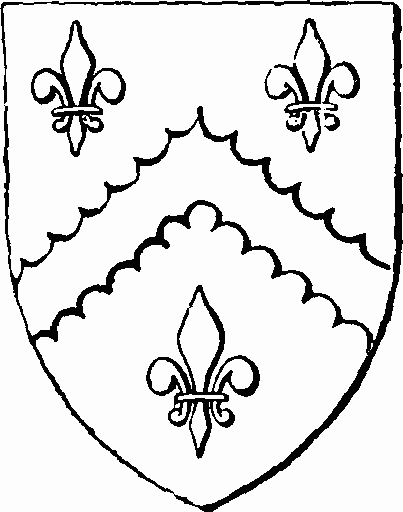
Escutcheon of the achievement of arms of Grindlay, Sussex cadet branch (18th century).

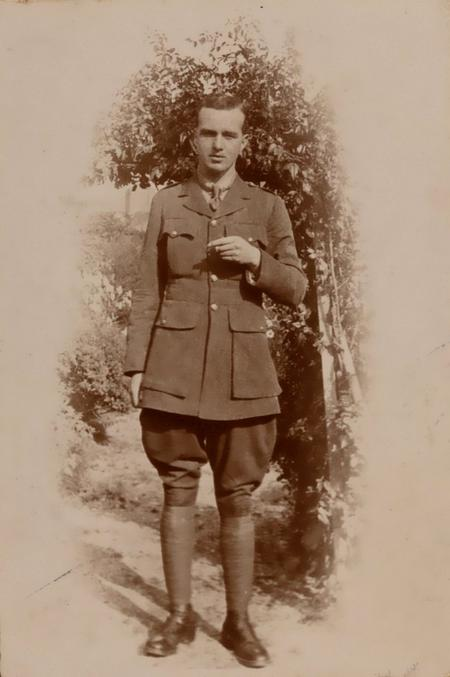
Lieutenant Alexander Brown Grindlay, Officer with the RAMC and Royal Scots during WWI, mentioned in dispatches and Distinguished Conduct Medal recipient.

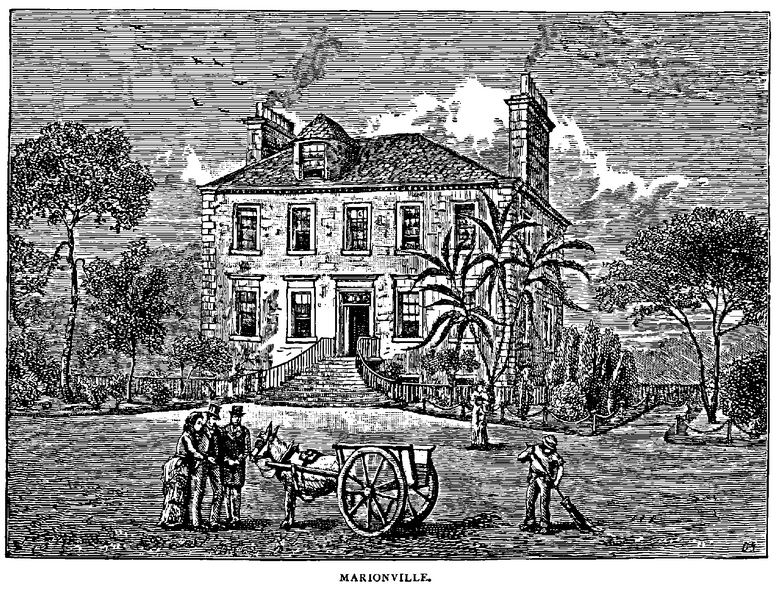
Marionville House, the residence of Captain Thomas Grindlay, master of Trinity House of Leith.

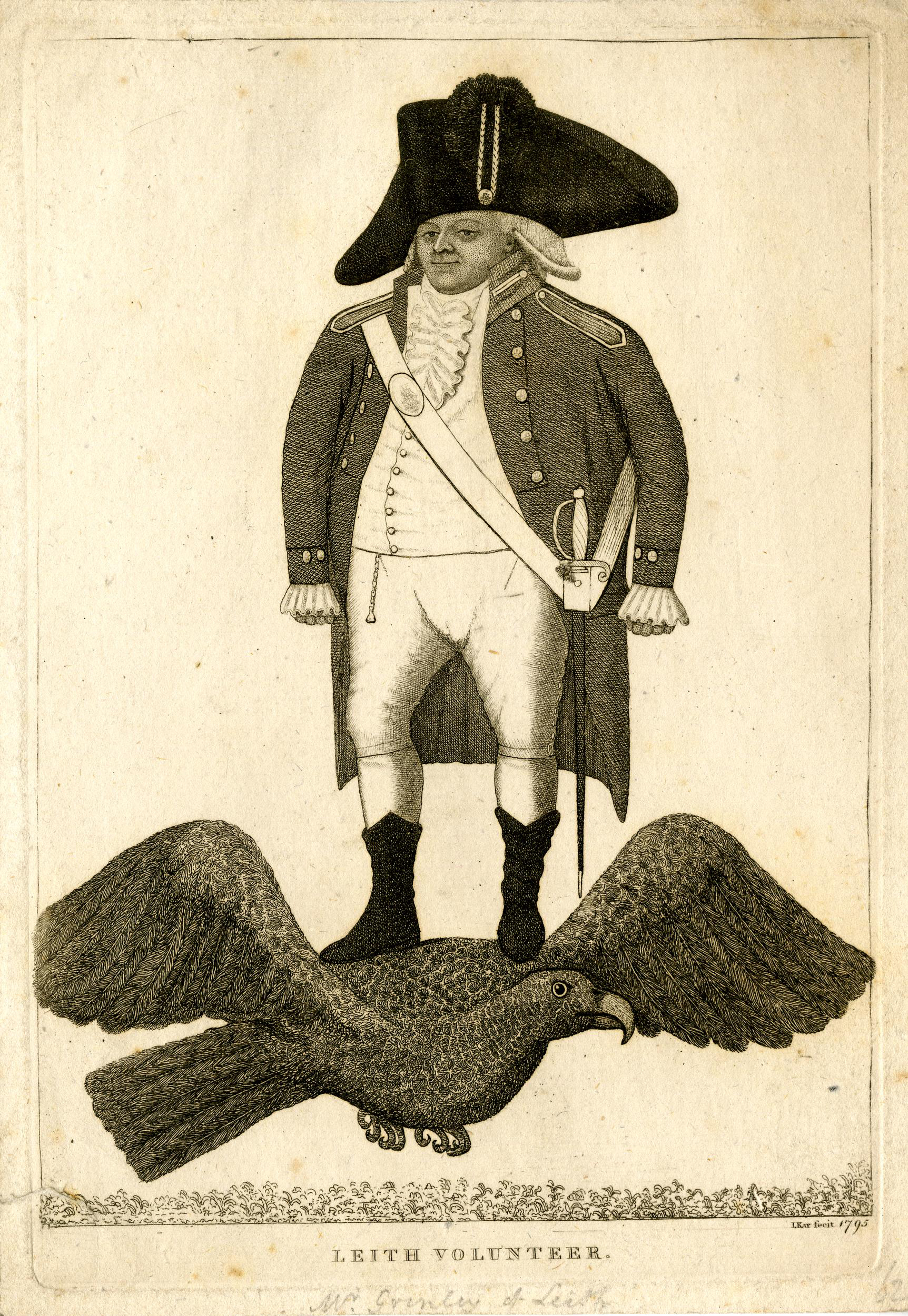
William 'Spread Eagle' Grinly (Grindlay), soldier, merchant, and mariner, by John Kay (1795).

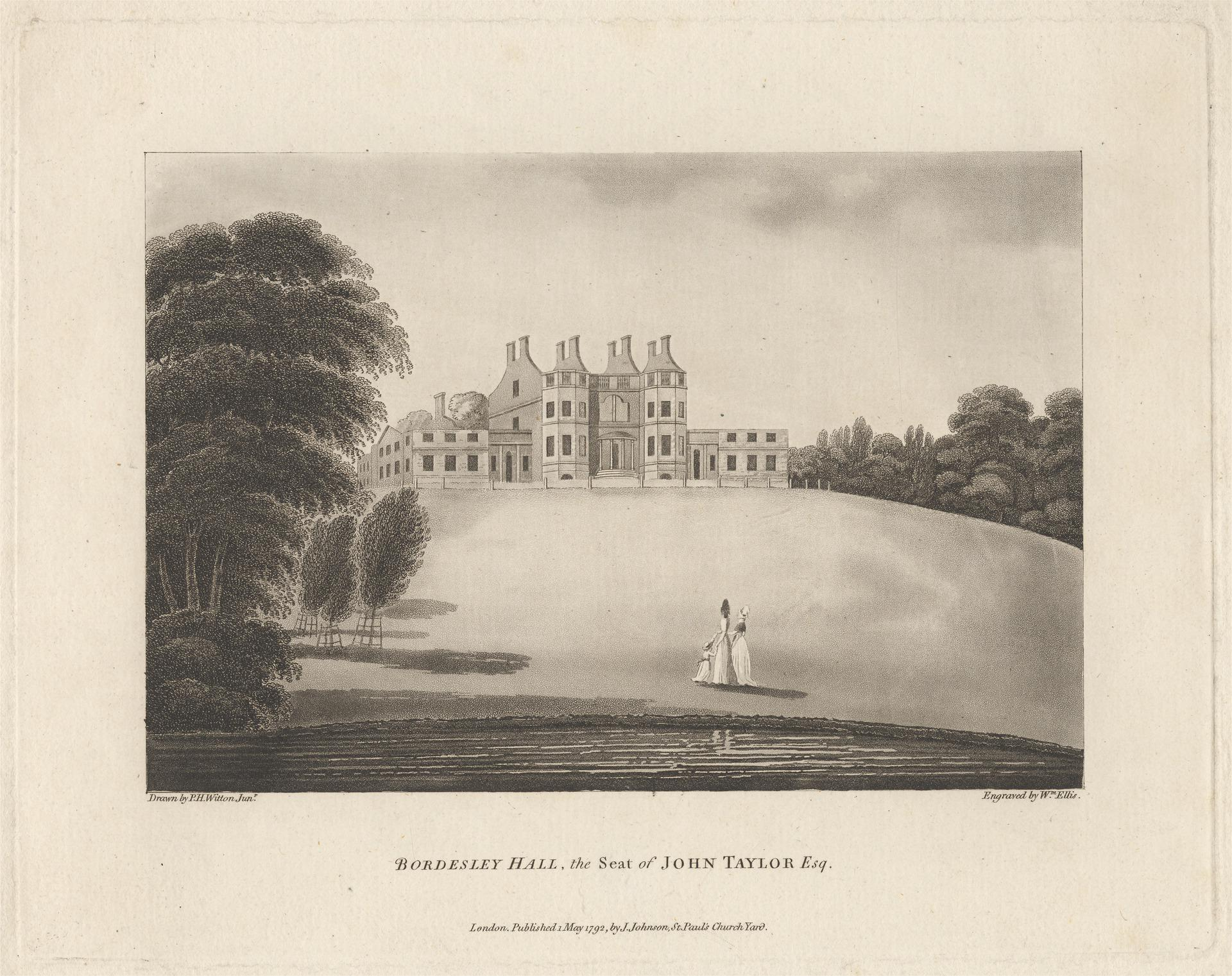
Bordesley Hall, 18th century manor house rebuilt on the site of the ancestral family seat, by Philip Henry Witton Jr.

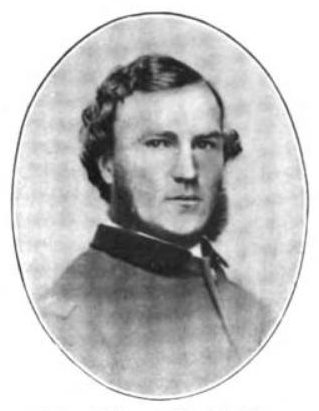
Brevet Brigadier General James Glas Grindlay, American Civil War veteran and Medal of Honor recipient.

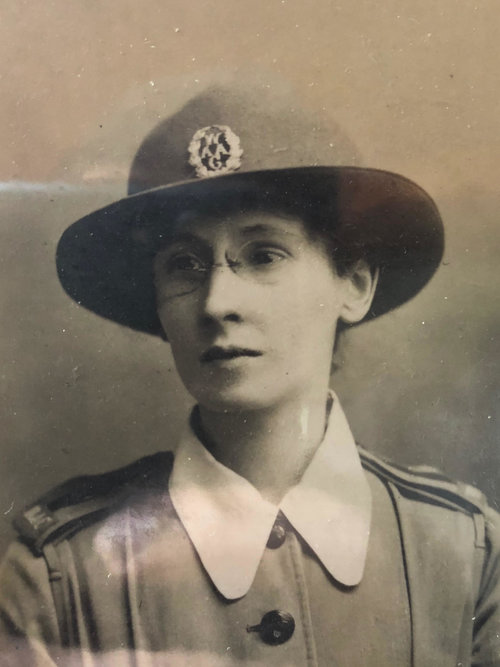
Isabella Grindlay, member of the WAAC during WWI and later acclaimed war poet.

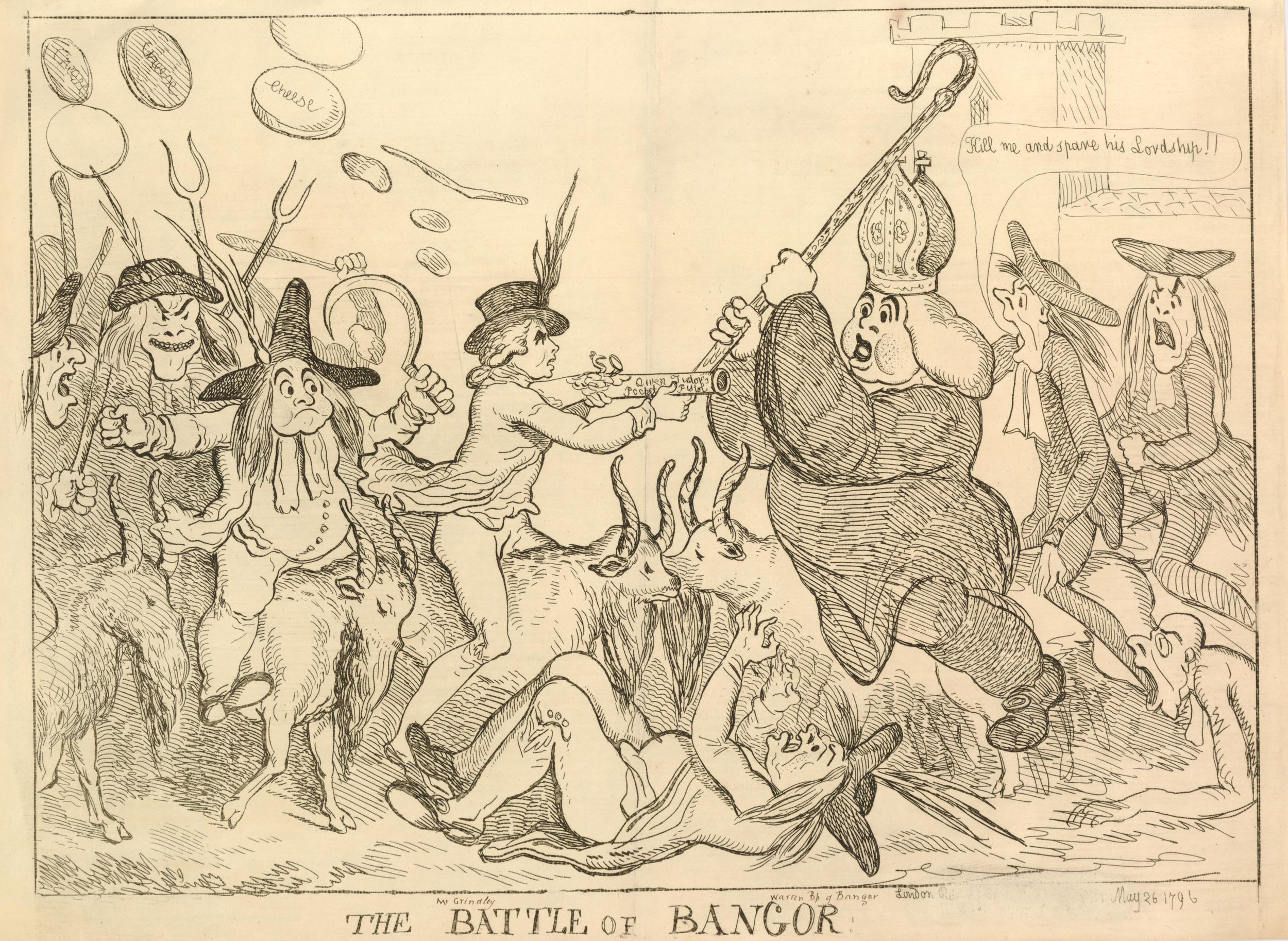
The Battle of Bangor.^{[ac]} A satirical depiction of the altercation between Samuel Grindley, Deputy Registrar of the Diocese of Bangor, and The Right Reverend John Warren, Bishop of Bangor, by Richard Newton (1796).

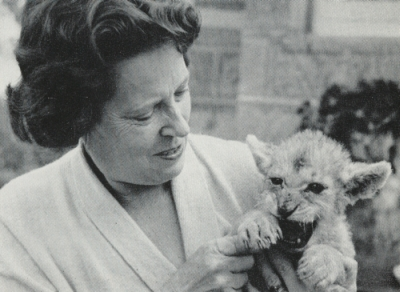
Irene Grindlay, who hand-reared Mara the Lioness with her husband Douglas on the Grindlay coffee plantations in Kenya, Africa (1965).

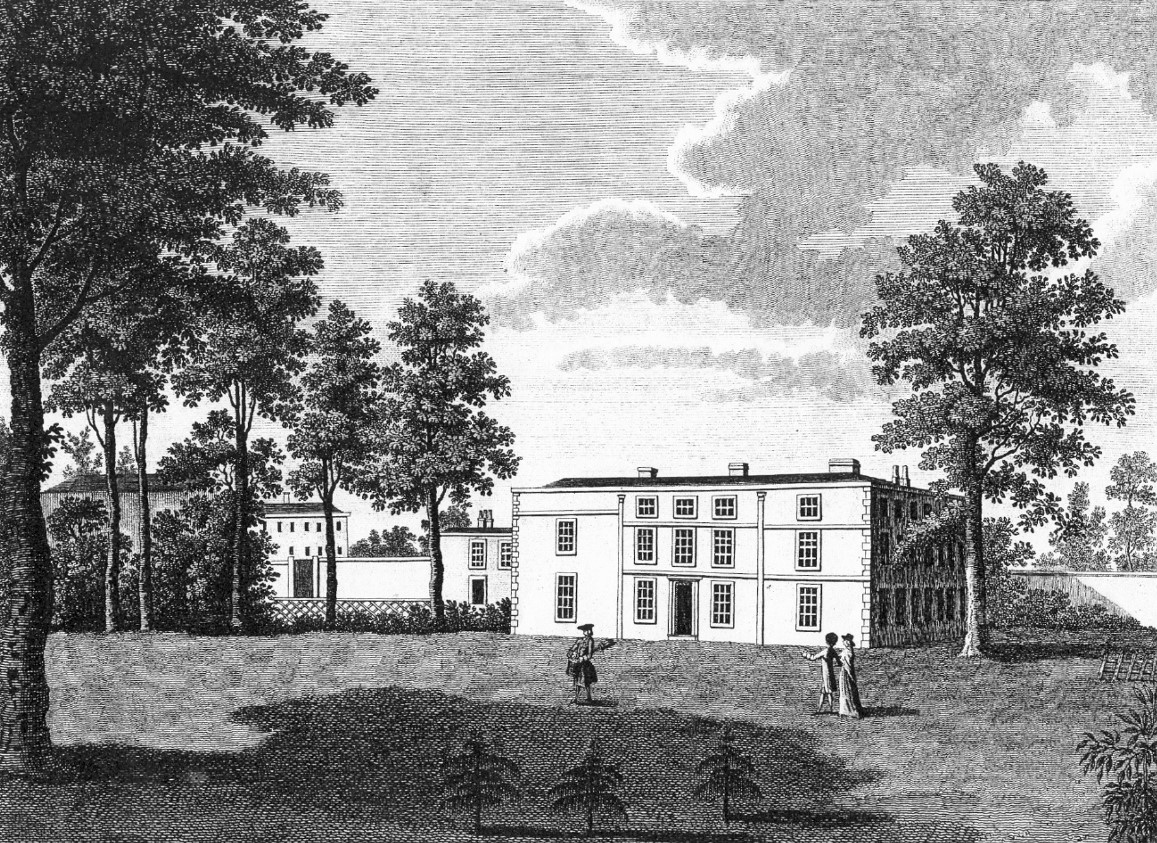
Carshalton Manor, family country estate purchased by Capt. Robert Melville Grindlay from Samuel Long and the Earls of Lauderdale, by James Roberts (1787).

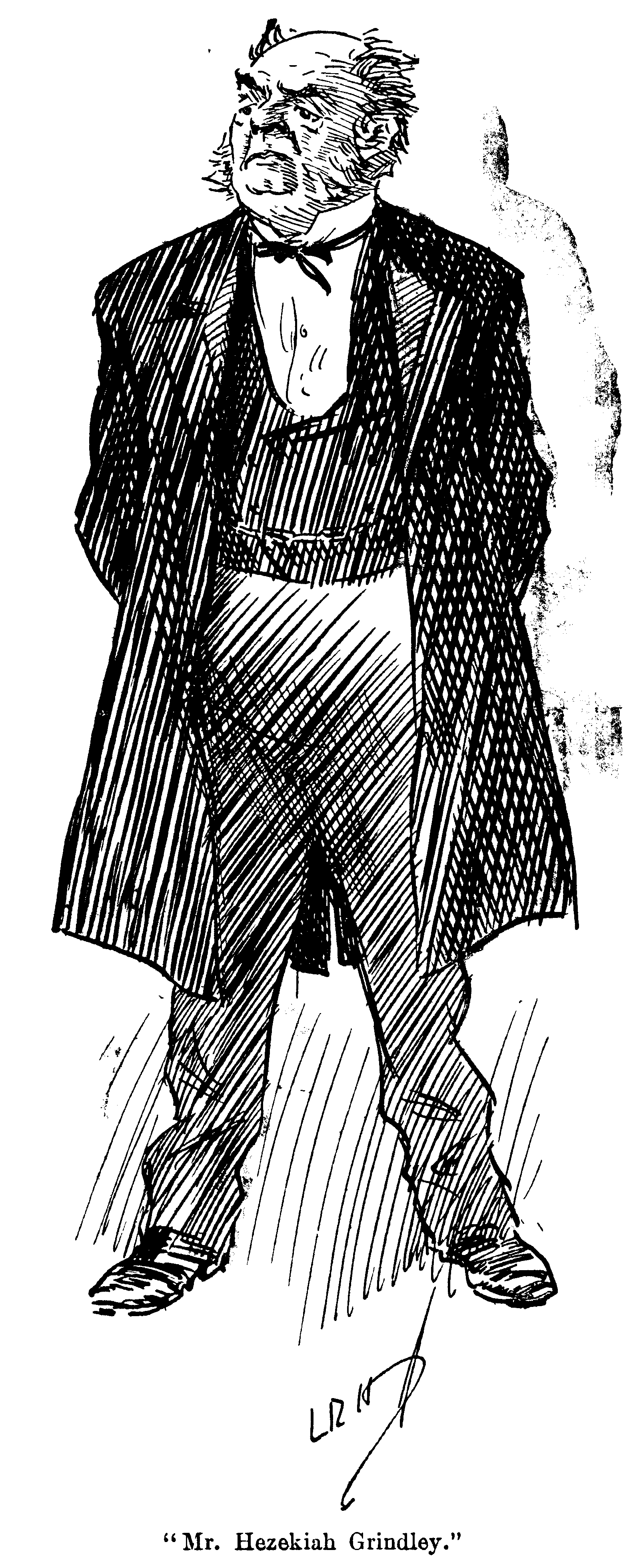
Hezekiah Grindley, Esq. by Leonard Raven-Hill for Jerome Klapka Jerome and The Windsor Magazine (1904).

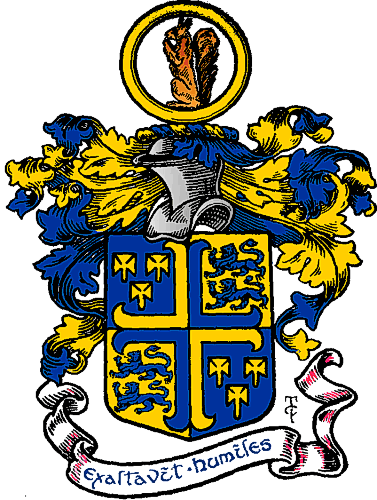
Arms of Aston Manor Borough Council, Warwickshire, which drew inspiration from those of the de Picquigny, Holte, and Grindlay families.^{[ad]}

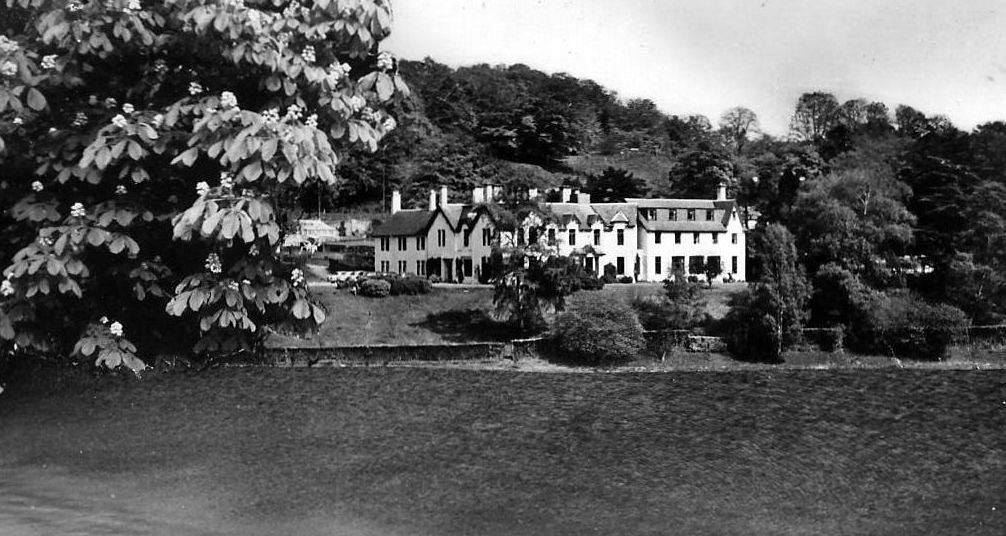
Lagreach House, built by the Grindlay Cowan line of the family in the 19th century.

== See also ==
- Grindlay (Grindley)
- Grindlays Bank
- Grindlay Peerless
- W H Grindley
- Clan Home
- Clan Wedderburn
- Earl of Northumbria
- Earl of Lothian
- Barons Gridley
- Gresley Baronets
- Simpson Baronets
- Coffin-Greenly Baronets
- House of Grailly
- House of Tosny
- List of banking families
- List of family seats of English nobility
- British nobility

== Footnotes ==
^a An increasingly rare surname, Grindlay likely has its roots in the clearance of ancient English forest and the creation of the leāh or leā (see Leah and Lea), an area of open space within a woodland for settlement, particularly in the former Forest of Arden of Warwickshire and Staffordshire (see History of Warwickshire). These areas were often enclosed or walled off and controlled by a single family group, such as the ancestors of the Grindlay family, who in expanding their medieval holdings, simultaneously further established both their surname and the names of the places they controlled, as the creators and inhabitants of various grēne/grynde leāh/leā.
^b This would make the family one of a limited number in Britain able to trace their patrilineal ancestry back to the Anglo-Saxon period, namely the 9th century, with the others being those of Arden, Berkeley, Swinton, Wentworth and Neville, although their claim and most of the others are disputed. Notably the Arden and Swinton families are also of Warwickshire and Berwickshire.
^c Earlier spellings of these closely located villages and hamlets resemble those of the family surname. Grindley was formerly spelt both Grenlee and Grenley, Grindley Brook and Tushingham cum Grindley were formerly spelt Grenlegh, Grenelee, and Grynleye, and Little Gringley was formerly spelt both Greneleye and Grenlay.
^d The Domesday Book records two ancestors of the family, Stannechetel (Stenkil) of Witton and Godric of Shuttington, holding lands centred around 'Coleshelle' (Coleshill), later the Hemingford Hundred, both prior to the conquest of 1066 and afterwards following the Great Survey of 1086. Nearby Aski or Aschi of Edgbaston is a possible relation owing to proximity, but by 1086 his lands had been granted to a Drogo of Whitley, most likely a Norman, by William FitzAnsculf. The fiefs in this area of the Midlands, particularly those under the overlordships of Robert de Beaumont and Thorkil of Warwick (see Arden family), are known to have included a high proportion of English survivors, many of whom maintained control of their lands after the invasion. The 1198 to 1292 Liber Feodorum (or Book of Fees), records a later ancestor, Robertum de Grend' or Grendley (c.1235), paying the treasury collectors scutage for his "old feffment" held on behalf of Roger de Somery, the feudal baron of Dudley, and descendent of Ansculf de Picquigny.
^e The recorded full name of Galfridi de Greneleye, was Galfridi, Galfridus or Geoffery de Warilowe de Greneleye.
^f Thomas Grenley, Grenely or Greneley was a fellow of Oriel College, Oxford in the early 15th century. He became a University Proctor in 1424, and eventually acted as Vice Chancellor in 1436 and 1437 (see List of vice-chancellors of the University of Oxford).
^g The arms of William Gyrdeley listed in the Dictionary of British Arms – Medieval Ordinary Vol II (1996), appear against Girdill, Gridley, Grindlay and Gyrdele. The entry states in the notes that for Grindlay specifically, the chevron may also appear in gold, a 'chev Or'. The same arms, appear for Girdler in The General Armory of England, Scotland, Ireland, and Wales (1884), but with 'many hurts' or roundels azure for difference, indicating a possible familial link. Professor Patrick Hanks suggests in his The Oxford Dictionary of Family Names in Britain and Ireland (2016), that Girdley or Gyrdeley is probably a metathesised variant of Gridley or Grindley.
^h John Greneley should not be confused with Sir John Ernley or Ernle (see Ernle family).
^i The family (Henry de Grenley) are recorded as being in dispute primarily with Robert de Ferrers, 6th Earl of Derby and his widow Eleanor at the end of the 13th century, however Robert and Eleanor's son, John de Ferrers, 1st Baron Ferrers of Chartley (see Barons of Chartley) and the Barons of Groby, all subsequently became embroiled in the wider legal action initiated by Eleanor (see Ferrers family).
^j The family (Robert and Matilda de Grenleye) were involved in a legal dispute over land in the parish of Stowe (see Stowe-by-Chartley) Staffordshire, with Thomas del Leghe of Neuton, in 1369. Though established landed gentry by the 14th century, the Leghs went on to become a powerful aristocratic family with lands across Cheshire, Warwickshire and other counties, which included the Earls of Chichester, Barons of Stoneleigh, Barons of Newton and others (see Leghs of Lyme, Leghs of Adlington, Baron Leigh, etc.).
^k The family continued their expansion into Shropshire, South Lancashire and the Isle of Man (see Thomas Grindley), with some resettling as far north as Lanarkshire during Glasgow's industrial expansion. Another possible eponym existing in South Lancashire, is Gryndley Cross (c.1560), later Grindlow alias Greenlow Cross or Marsh, then Grindley Marsh (c.1798) or Grindley-Marsh (c.1801), and now thought to be Greenheys, part of Greater Manchester. The area was previously named Withacre or Whitacre, but this changed around the period the family are thought to have taken lands in the area.
^l Captain Robert Melville Grindlay, E.I.C.S., M.R.A.S., etc. (1786–1877), served in the East India Company's Army and the 7th Bombay Infantry from 1804 to 1820. He moved to India as a cadet aged 17, reached the rank of captain in 1817, and retired from the military in 1820 at the age of 34, after which he returned to England and established Grindlays Bank. During his time in India, he made numerous sketches and drawings as a self-taught amateur artist, recording the life and landscape of the subcontinent (see Category:Robert Melville Grindlay). Although born in Marylebone, then a village near London, his distinctive middle name pays homage to his Scottish Grindlay ancestry and links between his forebears and the small but powerful noble Melville family of Midlothian and Fife (see Robert Melville, 1st Lord Melville, Earl Melville, Clan Melville, etc.).
^m Similarly to the family name, both settlements have had various related spellings over time. Grinnla, now Greenlaw in Berwickshire, was formerly spelt Grenlay, Greynley, and Girnelay, and Greenley in Northumberland, was formerly spelt Grenelay, Greenlee, and Greenlawe, with ley or lay and law being documented aliases. Greenley sits between Greenlee Lough and Greenley Cleugh; Cleugh being a word of Scottish origin for "a steep valley or ravine", with Greenley Cleugh literally meaning a green valley clearing, and a possible source of the dual green / valley clearing origins of the Grindlay surname, put forward by Henry Harrison in his Surnames of the United Kingdom: A Concise Etymological Dictionary (1969).
^n William also later acted as clerk to John de Mowbray, 2nd Baron Mowbray.
^oIn 1801 George Grindlay made a substantial donation of books from his private library to his alma mater, the Royal High School in Edinburgh. Known as the 'Grindlay Bequest', the bestowal comprised many hundreds of volumes and was, and still remains, the largest ever received since the library's foundation in 1658. The remains of the Grindlay collection are now in the National Library of Scotland, having been donated by the school in 1964.
^p In addition to owning a fleet of trade ships originally based in Grangemouth, Scotland and then later Liverpool, Walter Grindlay was also a sea captain and was shipmaster of the vessel the 'Grindlay' when it transported Scottish immigrant survivors of the destroyed 'India' to Port Phillip in Australia in 1841.
^q The Grindlay and Simpson families of Edinburgh were closely interrelated, forming a single extended family. Walter Grindlay was cousin of Sir James Young Simpson, 1st Baronet, both sharing Grindlay grandparents, and James's future wife, Janet Grindlay (later Lady Janet Grindlay Simpson) was a first cousin once removed and daughter of Walter Grindlay. Sir Walter Grindlay Simpson, 2nd Baronet was Walter Grindlay's nephew. James was granted his own arms when made a baronet.
^r The surname of Grindal has several former spellings, including Grindle, Grindalli, and possibly Grenelawe. The scholar and tutor to Queen Elizabeth I, William Grindal, is a probable relation of Edmund Grindal having also been born in the same coastal village of St. Bees, Cumberland.
^s The "green mound and plant of oak" augmentation of honour awarded to Sir William de Grenlay, William Greneleye or Guillaume Greenlee (c.1372) following the siege of Harfleur, is retained in the 18th century arms of the Greenlees line of the family, awarded to Dr. Robert Greenlees of Scotland in 1750.
^t The tincture of the charges and ordinaries of the arms of the Nottinghamshire cadet branch, though likely argent, are unknown, and are therefore greyed out in the accompanying illustration.
^u Hoole Old Hall was purchased from John de Hoole, the Lord of Hoole, during the reign of Edward II, by the Abbot of Chester and served as the grange for the abbots of the Abbey of St Werburgh (now Chester Cathedral, following the dissolution of the Abbey in 1540). During the 14th century the Old Hall (and other properties including the original Hoole Hall, destroyed during the English Civil War, as opposed to the current Hoole Hall) came into the possession of the Bunbury baronets, who owned it for the next 400 years, before passing to the Grindlay family.
^vThe Manor House of Carshalton, occasionally known as Mansion House, and later as Samuel Long's House following substantial extensions by Samuel Long (and his wife Lady Jane Maitland, 4th daughter of James Maitland, 7th Earl of Lauderdale) in the 18th century, was purchased by Captain Robert Melville Grindlay in 1821 for £7020. Samuel's father Beeston Long had purchased the property from James Scawen, with Henry Bathurst, 2nd Earl Bathurst acting as executor. The estate comprising the house, outbuildings (including a farm, stables, cottages, etc.), lawns, pleasure grounds, and park land of around 50 acres, served as a country residence for Grindlay who was primarily based at his townhouse in Regent's Park, London. The house itself was eventually demolished in late 1822. Carshalton Manor should not to be confused with either the nearby Stone Court, purchased by John Cator (a London merchant) in 1697 and heavily remodelled between 1706 and 1710 before being demolished around 1800, Carshalton Park House, built by George Taylor (a sugar plantation owner) in 1784–1785 and demolished in 1927, or Carshalton House, built in the early 18th century by Edward Carleton (a tobacco merchant) which is now part of St Philomena's Catholic High School for Girls.
^w The Orchardfield Estate was also known as the Grindlay Estate after it was purchased by George and William Grindlay in 1782. During the 19th century, the Grindlay family trust and the Merchant Company of Edinburgh, developed the estate in line with the feuing plan proposed by the renown Scottish architect William Burn, and agreed by William Trotter of Ballindean, the Lord Provost of Edinburgh. Grindlay Street and Grindlay Court, which both reside within the boundaries of the former estate, were named so in honour of the family.
^x Though Edmund Grindal was born at Cross Hill House in St. Bees, his niece, Mabel Grindal, would take possession of the Manor of St. Bees and 80 acres of land, which became a primary family residence thereafter.
^y No known record of arms or insignia of the Anglo-Saxon thegns Hereweald and Æðel Grēneleāh or Gryndeleā (or other Old English equivalents) survives.
^z The arms of Grindall listed in The General Armory of England, Scotland, Ireland, and Wales (1884) and dated to the end of the 18th century are most likely those of Vice Admiral Sir Richard Grindall KCB. These arms and those of Grindal (Edmund Grindal) and Grindlay are identical bar sub-ordinary differencing (pheons for Grindlay, doves for Grindal, and pea-hens for Grindall; the later two both being crests of the Grindlay family).
^aa The arms of the Greenly line of the family were adopted during the 17th century, and draw their inspiration from those of the Green family (formerly spelt Grene and Greene), in whose various arms, stags and the colour green feature heavily. This was due to an erroneously surmised association with the Green family during that period.
^ab The arms of the Gridley line reflect those of the City of Manchester (based on those of Albert de Gresle, 1st Baron of Manchester, to which the family have possible links) because of their Barony of Stockport, part of Greater Manchester. Arnold Gridley, 1st Baron Gridley grew up in Abbey Dore, Herefordshire.
^ac Samuel Grindley, the Deputy Registrar of the Consistory Court of Bangor, prosecuted The Right Reverend John Warren, Bishop of Bangor, and others (namely The Reverend Dr. Owen, The Reverend John Roberts, The Reverend John Williams, and Thomas Jones, Esq.) for an assault and a riot. The Bishop had appointed Grindley as his agent in early 1792, and his own nephew as Registrar of the diocecse in February of the same year, but due to his being underage, Grindley was appointed deputy in March. Grindley acted as Registrar until 1794 when the nephew came of age, after which he continued as deputy. Ahead of the general election of 1796, the Bishop wanted to campaign in support of interests in Caernarfonshire and applied to Grindley for support in his cause, however Grindley refused as he reportedly disapproved of anyone exerting undue influence over the election process. Considering it best to break his connection with the Bishop following the disagreement, Grindley resigned as agent in January 1796, and planned to resign as Deputy Registrar on 22 February, remaining in position until such time. However, the Bishop, wishing to have Grindley removed as quickly as possible, awaited his visit to Anglesey whereupon he forced entry into his office and altered the locks. Grindley returned 7 January to find his office, which adjoined the Cathedral of Bangor, had been broken into. Grindley returned on 8 January with his husbandman and others, broke open the door, and defended the office from an invasion by the Bishop, his chaplain, two other parsons, and fifth man. Grindley went with loaded pistols and reportedly threatened the bishop, but did not fire. The fight continued until the Bishop's wife, Elizabeth Southwell, intervened and dragged the Bishop away. The case was tried at Shrewbury Assizes on 26 July 1796, with Mr Adam for the prosecution and Mr Erskine (later Baron Erskine) for the defence. The Judge, Mr Justice Heath, summed up in favour of Grindley, but the special jury acquitted all the defendants. The original etching is held at the British Museum, and has featured in Catalogue of Political and Personal Satires Preserved in the Department of Prints and Drawings in the British Museum by Mary Dorothy George and other publications. Of note is the inscription on the pistol, "Owen Tudor's Pocket Pistol", a presumed reference to Sir Owen Tudor.
^adGranted on 22 March 1904, the full achievement of arms for Aston Manor was 'Blazon – Quarterly azure and or a cross moline quarterly counterchanged between in the first and forth quarters three crosses formy fitchy placed two and one or and in the second and third quarters two lions passant in pale azure, Crest – On a wreath or and azure within an annulet or a squirrel sejant erect proper, Motto – Exaltavit humiles (He has exalted the humble)'. The municipal coat of arms was heavily influenced by the arms of the de Picquigny, Holte, and Grindlay families. The blue lions were likely derived from the arms of Ansculf de Picquigny, the Norman-French baron awarded lands around Birmingham and across Warwickshire after the conquest of 1066. The fitchy crosses and squirrel crest are drawn from the arms of the Holte family, Baronets of Aston and seated at Aston Hall. The gold and blue quartering and counterchanged cross reflect the arms of the Grindlay family, neighbouring landowners and long associated with the area.
