= William Grinly =

British soldier, merchant, and mariner (1748 – 1827)

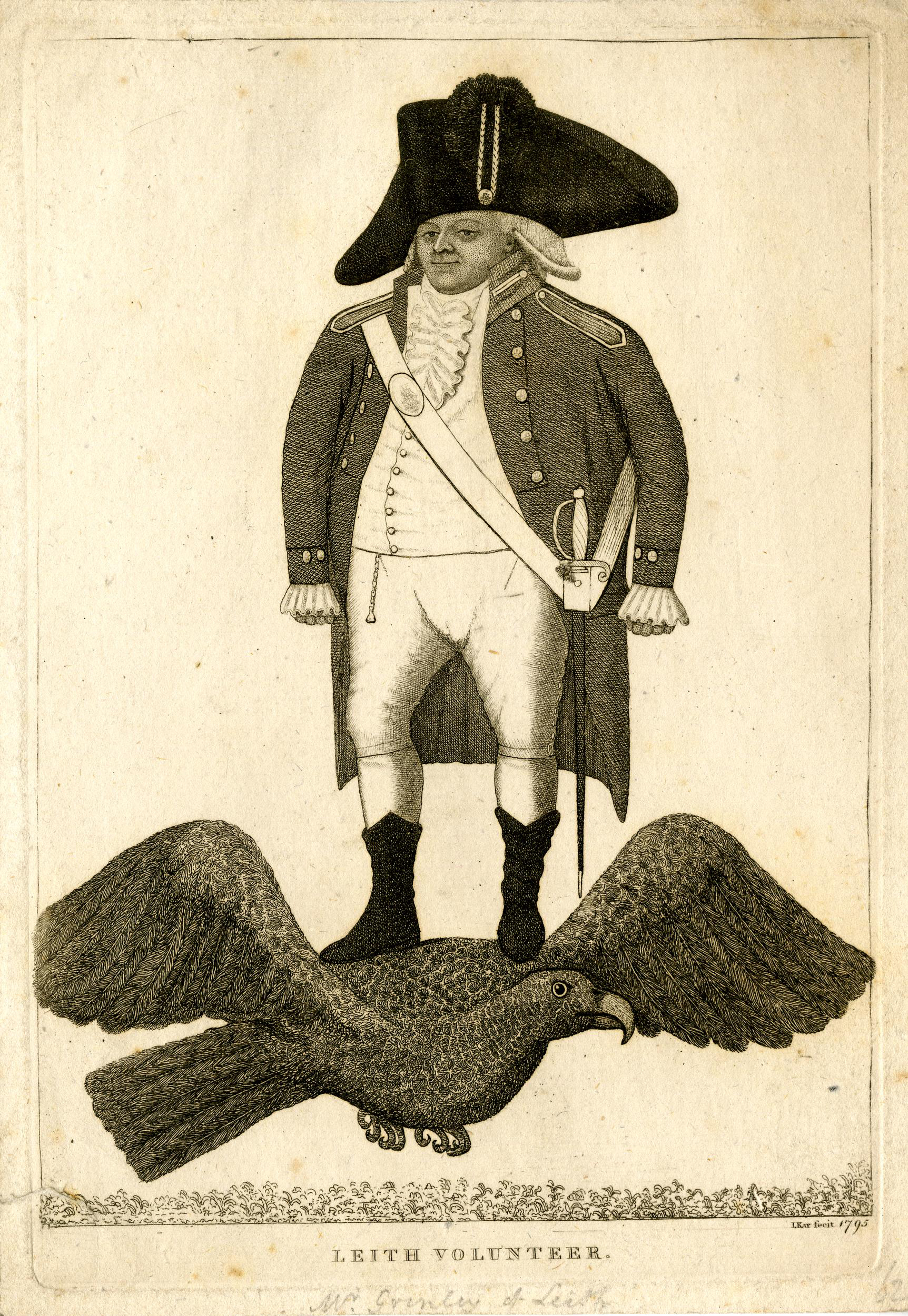
- Etching of William Grinl(e)y atop a 'Spread Eagle' by John Kay, 1795
- Born: 1748; Borrowstounness, Linlithgowshire
- Died: 1827 (aged 80); Leith, Edinburghshire
- Other names: Grindly, Grinley, Grindley, Grindlay
- Occupations: Soldier; Merchant; Shipowner; Ship Broker; Auctioneer
- Title: Quartermaster of the Royal Leith Volunteers; Member of the Merchant Company of Edinburgh; Elder of South Leith Church
- Family: Grindlay
- Awards: Freedom of the Burgh of Kirkcudbright; Freedom of the City of Cork

William 'Spread Eagle' Grinly (also Grinley, Grindley or Grindlay)^{[a]} (1748 – 1827) was a British soldier, merchant, and mariner during the 18th and 19th centuries, known for his often distinctive dress and flamboyant character.

== Life and family ==
=== Early years ===
Grinly was born in Borrowstounness, near Edinburgh in 1748, to a prominent seafaring family. His father and all three of his brothers were shipowners and shipmasters, and as a young man he travelled extensively as part of the family merchant shipping business, including going supercargo to Holland, France, Spain, Russia, and America.

During his early travels Grinly was shipwrecked multiple times and twice captured by privateers. In the late 18th century, he was aboard the Isabella when it was captured on its homeward journey, and the entire ship's company robbed and marooned, with Grinly being stripped of all his possessions apart from his watch. Several of the shipwrecks he survived, particularly off the coast of France, saw the entire ship and all cargo lost.

=== Shipping, soldiering and philanthropy ===
Grinly also pursued various independent business ventures and was active in supporting the interests of local people. He established Anderson & Grinly, a mercantile firm initially based in Bo'ness and Leith, but operations expanded across southern Scotland to include areas of the southwest coast. In 1773, he was presented with the Freedom of the Burgh of Kirkcudbright, for his philanthropy and expedient business dealings in support of the area. However, when his operations in Bo'ness ultimately proved unsuccessful, he travelled to Ireland to establish a new line of enterprise and support the founding of various Protestant stranger churches. Although there only 2 years, his activities resulted in him being awarded the Freedom of the City of Cork on 7 June 1781, before he again relocated back to Scotland.

For several years after returning to Leith, Grinly operated a successful shipping business, but as a result of over speculation in maritime underwriting he lost the majority of his wealth. However, undeterred by his misfortunes, he then again reentered the world of commerce as a ship broker, merchant, and auctioneer, based in Tolbooth Wynd, Leith and amassed a considerable fortune enabling him to retire entirely from business.

Grinly was Quartermaster of the Royal Leith Volunteers following their embodiment and receiving of colours on 26 September 1795, presented by the Lord-lieutenant to Capt. Bruce, son of Robert Bruce, Lord Kennet. In 1797, he was one of the 120 sea captains who volunteered to fight with the Royal Navy during the French Revolutionary and Napoleonic Wars, and while the Imperial Russian Navy was stationed in Leith Roads, he frequently met and conversed with the officers regarding developments in the east, drawing on his knowledge of Russia and previous travels to the country.

All throughout his life, Grinly was a committed Protestant, being an Elder of South Leith Parish Church for around 30 years and a close friend of William Robertson. His efforts to promote improvements across Edinburgh and Leith as a member of the Merchant Company of Edinburgh, and his high standing in the community meant he was regularly asked to act as a local magistrate, although he always refused on the grounds that he did not have the time to do justice to the office.

=== Marriage and later life ===
Grinly married twice, firstly to Isabel, daughter of John Ritchie Esq. of Middle Thorn, with whom he had ten children, four sons and six daughters, and secondly to Susan, daughter of John Scott, 3rd Laird of Malleny of Malleny House.

In the last years of his life he went entirely blind and had to be escorted at all times when outside. He died in 1827 aged 80, survived by his second wife, and his remains were interred in the family burial ground at South Leith Church.

== Soubriquet ==
The soubriquet of the 'Spread Eagle' was given to him by a Mr McLean, a merchant of Leith, due to his stature and distinctive manner of walking.^{[b]} He was known to regularly travel to Edinburgh dressed in the uniform of the Royal Leith Volunteers, and "show off among the merchants and country people" near the Mercat Cross opposite the Royal Exchange.

"Mr Grinly was short in statue, but active – always well dressed, and particularly smart in his appearance. From a peculiar rotundity of body, and a strange habit of throwing out his legs and arms in walking, he obtained the soubriquet of the "Spread Eagle". He was generally held in esteem, although his sarcastic humour was sometimes felt to be "biting rude", and, as with most other persons of his calling, excess of modesty could not be enumerated among his defects. Notwithstanding his somewhat grotesque rotundity of shape, it was a weakness of Mr Grinly to believe himself possessed of a handsome figure. His vanity in this respect almost exceeds credulity." – John Kay (1742 – 1826)

It was during one of his visits to Edinburgh that the Scottish caricaturist and engraver John Kay, sketched the 'Spread Eagle' and entered it into his A Series of Original Portraits and Caricature Etchings published in 1838, accompanied by an extensive biographical profile, and where it featured alongside other prominent individuals of the day, including Adam Smith, Thomas Jefferson, Henry Dundas, 1st Viscount Melville and others.

== Notable anecdotes ==
Several notable quotations and anecdotes were attributed to Grinly throughout his life, some of which were captured by John Kay in his A Series of Original Portraits and Caricature Etchings. Many of those recorded took place in the law courts and auction houses of Leith and Edinburgh.

"If I thought there was a better made man in Leith...", said Grinly apparently highly offended "...I would go hang myself!"
– Stated while stood atop a pile of wooden logs on the shore of Leith port, in response to a group of porters in his employment who suggested 'The Doctor',^{[c]} another gentleman afforded one of Mr McLean's soubriquets, was more handsome than he.

"Your name is William Grinly?", "It is, my lord.", "You are a merchant in Leith?", "I am, my lord.", Do you know the prisoner at the bar?", "I do. He was often employed by me, and usually had the keys of my yard in his possession all night.", "Did you ever miss any goods out of your yard when he had the charge?", "Never, my lord!" was his emphatic reply.
– A courtroom exchange with the judge presiding over the trial of Mr Brown, a carter, committed on suspicion of stealing from the yard of a Mr Crawford. The case drew much interest across Leith due to Mr Brown's long confinement, poor health, and prepossessing appearance. The evidence of Mr. Grinly was said to have been the only means of saving the culprit's life. Brown was duly acquitted, and Grinly left the court to much applause.

"Your name is William Grinly?", "It is my lord.", "You are a merchant in Leith?", "I am not my lord" in a tone and gesture that attracted all eyes, "You are here set down merchant in Leith", "My lord..." said Grinly, archly smiling as he made use of the legal phrase "...that is quite a misnomer!"^{[d]}
– Made from the witness box while giving evidence in a case against the Hull Shipping Company for non delivery of goods. The conversation was followed by hearty, involuntary laughter from both Grinly and the entire courtroom. He politely acknowledged the appreciation with a bow and complacently resumed his position.

"Sir, I challenge you to exchange pistols with me at the back of the wall.", "Hurry home...," said Grinly, "...and make your last testament. You will have no chance with me—a soldier!—a Leith Volunteer!"
– An argument with a wealthy tradesman from Edinburgh, who in a violent temper, upon seeing a choice article of his sold to a rival for a low price, challenged Grinly as auctioneer to a duel. Following the rebuff from Grinly, the tradesman made his exit amid raucous laughter. The following day Grinly received a letter of apology and an accompanying gold headed walking cane from the tradesman.

"O, most certainly—go away!", "Go away!"
– Pronounced by the judge of a case to which Grinly had been summoned as a juryman. The date for trial had clashed with that of the sale of a considerable sum of expensive sugars by a Mr Sibbald, in which he was to act as auctioneer. Torn between the juror's fine or the loss of the sale, at the opening of proceedings Grinly immediately feigned sudden urgent illness and requested to leave, which when granted by the judge allowed him to avoid both. Grinly made the sale in good time and without fine. He was known to afterwards boast that he had "proved a match for the law".

== See also ==
- Grindlay (Grindley (disambiguation))
- Grindlay family

== Footnotes ==
^aThe family surname was spelt a number of different ways, often even within the same document, with instances of Grinly, Grindly, Grinley, Grindley and Grindlay all used interchangeably for William, his father and brothers, and the wider family.
^bThe same merchant who gave Grinly the nickname the 'Spread Eagle' had similar appellations for a great many of his neighbours. When the disorder of the financial affairs of Mr McLean resulted in his creditors needing to examine his accounts, with puzzlement they took note of several entries appearing against 'Spice Box', 'Clock Case’, 'Sow's Tail' and other "ridiculous designations".
^cThe title of 'The Doctor' is believed to have referred to an individual of distinction, who having undertaken medical training in his youth, subsequently provided advice and medicines to the local poor.
^dThroughout these proceedings, it was noted that although questioned directly by the counsel, Grinly addressed his replies solely to the bench.
