= Grindley =

Grindley may refer to:

== People ==
- David Grindley (born 1972), British 400 metres runner
- G. C. Grindley (1903–1976), British psychologist
- George Grindley (1925–2019), New Zealand geologist
- Nigel Grindley (born 1945), British biochemist
- Thomas Grindley (1864–1929), politician in Alberta, Canada
- Ryan Grindley (born 1989), engineer in United States

== Other ==
- Grindley Brook, small village in Shropshire, England
- Grindley Brook Halt railway station, railway halt in the village of Grindley Brook, Shropshire
- Grindley railway station, former railway station to serve the village of Grindley in Staffordshire
- Robert M. and Matilda (Kitch) Grindley House, private residence located in Detroit, Michigan
- Tushingham cum Grindley, former civil parish in Cheshire, England
- W H Grindley, pottery company founded in Stoke-on-Trent in 1880

== See also ==
- Grindlay, a surname
