= Archdeacon of Shetland =

The Archdeacon of Shetland was the head of the Archdeaconry of Shetland, a sub-division of the Diocese of Orkney in Scotland This archdeacon was one of the two archdeacons of the diocese, the other being the Archdeacon of Orkney. Next to the bishop, the Archdeacon of Shetland was the senior ecclesiastic in the diocese.

== List of known archdeacons of Shetland ==
- Andrew, 1215
- Nicholas, 1226
- Gilbert, 1260-1263 (later Bishop of Hamar)
- Peter, 1269-1270
- Sigurd, 1295
- William Johnson, 1360
- William Wood, x 1372
- William de Buchan, 1369 x 1372-1372 x 1383
- John Fule, 1372
- Walter de Buchan, 1383-1391
- Adam Easton, 1381 x 1385-1391 x 1396
- William de Lance, 1383
- Angus de Kirkness (Kerlues, Birknes), 1396-1429 x 1430
- David de Craigie (Cragy), 1420
- Malise de Tulloch, 1430-1445
- David Tulloch, 1457
- Thomas Tulloch, 1457
- John Sinclair, 1484-1484 x 1501
- James Sinclair, 1484
- William Turnbull, 1485-1487
- Henry Phankouth, 1501–1529.
- Mawnys Herwood, 1502
- Malcolm Halcro, 1529-1554
- Thomas Cheyne, 1572, 1584-1586
- William Hay, 1584-1628
- Alexander Cheyne, 1592
- John Mitchell, 1629

== Bibliography ==
- Watt, D.E.R., Fasti Ecclesiae Scoticanae Medii Aevi ad annum 1638, 2nd edition, (St Andrews, 1969), pp. 261–3
- Smith, Brian, Archdeacons of Shetland 1195–1567, in Ecclesia Nidrosiensis 1153-1537, (Trondheim 2003)
