= William de Grenlay =

English medieval knight (c.1350–1415)

Sir William de Grenlay
- Lord of Bordeshale
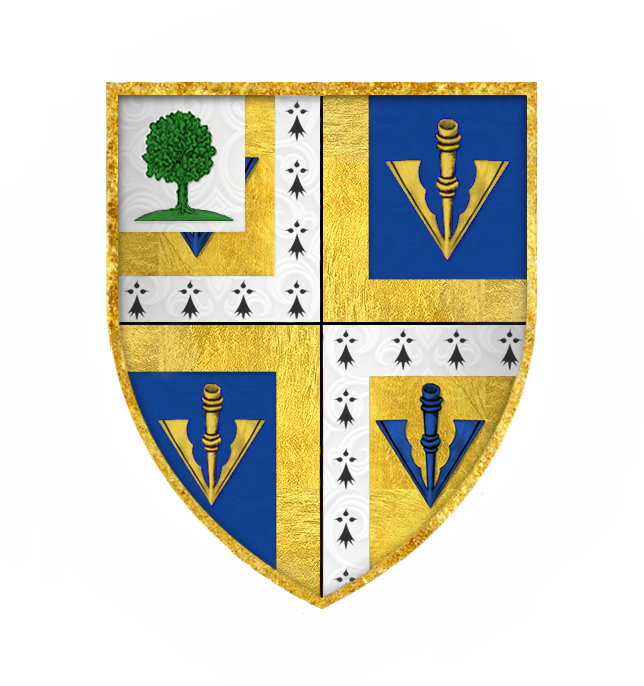
- Coat of arms of Sir William de Grenlay^{[a]}
- Born: c. 1350s Edgbaston, Warwickshire, England
- Died: 1415 (aged ~65); Harfleur, Normandy, France
- Cause of death: Slain in battle
- Family: de Grenlay (Grindlay)
- Occupation: Soldier
- Military career
- Relatives: John de Grenlay; Thomas de Grenlay^{[b]}; William de Grenlay
- Allegiance: Kingdom of England
- Branch: English Army: John Neville, 3rd Baron Neville; Thomas Beauchamp, 12th Earl of Warwick; King Henry V
- Service years: c. 1372 - 1415
- Rank: Knight; Man-at-Arms
- Conflicts: Hundred Years' War: Caroline War; Brittany Expedition (1372); John of Gaunt's Great Chevauchée (1373-4); Lancastrian War; Siege of Harfleur (1415)

Sir William de Grenlay (also Greneleye or Greenlee) (c.1350s – September 1415) of Edgbaston, Warwickshire, was a late medieval English knight and landowner who fought in several military campaigns during the Hundred Years' War.

== Origins ==
=== Early history ===
William (or Guillaume) was born into the English branch of the minor noble Anglo-Scottish family of de Grenlay (or Grindlay family). Reputedly descended from Northumbrian Anglo-Saxon thegns who were granted estates in Warwickshire by King Alfred the Great, by the 13th century, the family had established themselves as landowners, soldiers and administrators across the North Midlands, with branches in Warwickshire, Staffordshire and Nottinghamshire.

During this period, the lands held by William and his line of the family, which centred around the Manor of Bordeshale (see Bordesley Hall), now Balsall Health, in Warwickshire, made them vassals of both the Barons of Dudley (descendants of the de Somery family) and the Earls of Warwick (see House of Beaumont).

=== Lords of Bordeshale ===
Following the Conquest of 1066 the family became vassals of the new Norman barons, principally Ansculf de Picquigny, who was granted manors across the wider English Midlands by William the Conqueror, the caput of which was Dudley Castle. Although some of the lands awarded to de Picquigny included areas of Warwickshire and Staffordshire held by the de Grenlay family prior to the conquest, principally the Manor of Bordeshale, they were allowed to maintain de facto control of many of their ancestral estates, holding them in fief (or knight's fee) in return for homage and fealty to de Picquigny as tenant-in-chief.

Over the next century the barony lands held by de Picquigny across the West Midlands became dispersed among the Paganell, de Birmingham, and de Somery families due to a lack of direct male heirs, in contrast to the de Grenlay family who continued as manorial lords of their various estates. This arrangement is evident in the 1198 to 1292 Liber Feodorum (or Book of Fees) where Robertum de Grend' or Grendley (c.1235), an ancestor of William, is recorded paying the treasury collectors scutage for his "old feffment" held on behalf of Roger de Somery, the feudal baron of Dudley.

== Military service ==
=== Brittany expedition ===
On the 23 June 1372, William signed Letters of Protection and Attorney for service with John Neville, 3rd Baron Neville,^{[c]} a practise used by higher ranking men-at-arms (predominately knights and esquires), to safeguard his property and financial interests while fighting abroad.

The following month in July 1372, William sailed for Brittany with Neville, now the Steward of the Royal Household, who had been appointed as one of the ambassadors to negotiate an alliance between King Edward III and John IV, Duke of Brittany. William formed part of Neville's military affinity, guarding him and the other ambassadors on their journey through northern France.

The expedition returned safely to England later that year, with William leaving Neville's service prior to the beginning of his campaign in the Scottish Marches.

=== John of Gaunt's Great Chevauchée ===
A year later, on the 16 May 1373, William signed another set of Letters of Protection and Attorney ahead of serving with Thomas Beauchamp, 12th Earl of Warwick in France. He accompanied Beauchamp on various military campaigns during 1373, most notably as part of the mounted army of John of Gaunt's Great Chevauchée from Calais to Bordeaux. William survived the unsuccessful attempt to relieve Aquitaine and the ensuing 900-kilometre raid from northeast to southwest France, returning home in 1374.

As part of the Beauchamp's personal retinue, William is one of only a small number of peers, knights and esquires identifiable by name in the army of 1373.

=== Siege of Harfleur ===
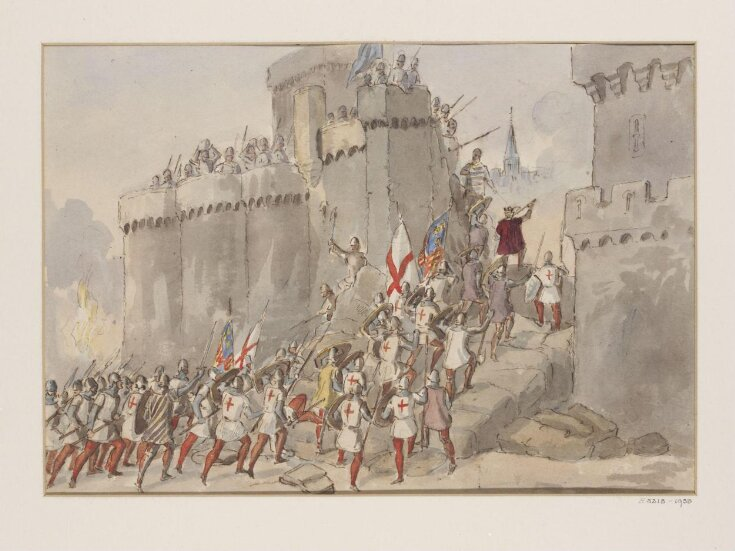
The 'Siege of Harfleur' by Thomas Grieve, 1859, depicting the storming of the breach in which William was slain.

In the summer of 1415, William returned to the battlefield during the escalation in hostilities that marked the beginning of the Lancastrian phase of the war, following intermittent treaties, truces, and peace negotiations that began with the Treaty of Bruges in 1375. Now around 65 years of age, a veteran campaigner, and a "Knight of the Royal Guard" or royal bodyguard (a precursor of the Yeoman of the Guard), William and his contingent of men-at-arms, sailed with King Henry V and his army across the English Channel to Chef-en-Caux near the mouth of the river Seine.

He was joined on the campaign by other members of the family. William's cousin, John de Grenlay fought at the siege under the command of Thomas Beaufort, Duke of Exeter and was garrisoned at Harfleur thereafter, and a second William de Grenlay (also Gyrdeley, Gridley or Grindlay), a member of the Sussex cadet branch of the family, fought at both Harfleur and the Battle of Agincourt as part of the personal retinue of John Holland, 2nd Duke of Exeter, the then Earl of Huntingdon.

During the final stages of the siege, William and his soldiers joined Holland and his retinue (which included his kinsman William de Grenlay) in the battle to take control of Harfleur's gate fortifications. In the push to take the town by force, William stormed a breach in the bastion walls alongside Holland and John Cornwall, 1st Baron Fanhope, but was mortally wounded in the melee to seize the Leure fortress gateway. His body and standard were recovered by his men after the outer walls were captured.

== Death and burial ==
After the siege William was buried on the fortress glacis where he was slain, and a sapling oak tree was planted upon his grave. He was posthumously commended by King Henry V, and as a reward for his valiance, was granted an augmentation of honour which entitled him to have his armorial bearings "topped by a green mound and plant of oak". This oak features in both his coat of arms and as an additional crest latterly borne by some of his wider family.^{[d]}

== See also ==
- Grindlay family
- List of family seats of English nobility

== Footnotes ==
^aAn illustration of the 19th century blazon attributed to William de Grenlay, based on the arms described by chroniclers in manuscripts deposited in the archives of Aston Hall, Birmingham.
^bThomas de Grenlay or Greynley, a later relation of William's, was a mounted man-at-arms in the early to mid 15th century. He fought with the English army in eastern Normandy, defending the region south of Rouen from the attacks of Étienne de Vignolles, known as La Hire, and his army of routiers and écorcheurs. He also fought at the Siege of Louviers alongside Sir William Fulthorpe in 1431.
^cThe date William signed his Letters of Protection and Attorney in 1372 aligns closely with the Battle of La Rochelle on 22 and 23 June 1372. He may have seen action at the battle, but this overlap is likely to be a coincidence given the scale of the naval defeat (i.e. the numbers of English soldiers slain or captured, and that all ships were reported sunk or captured) and his sailing to Brittany only a month later.
^dThe "green mound with plant of oak" awarded to William in 1415, was incorporated into the arms adopted by Dr. Robert Greenlees of Scotland in 1750.
