= Grindlay =

Grindlay is a surname from northern and central England, most notably associated with the Anglo-Scottish knightly Grindlay family. Notable people with the surname include:

- Alfred Robert Grindlay (1876 – 1965), British inventor, industrialist and politician
- Alfred Stephen Chaplin Grindlay (b. 1909), British industrialist
- Bruce Grindlay (born 1967), British organist, conductor, teacher
- James G. Grindlay (1840 – 1907), American Civil War veteran
- Reginald Robert Grindlay (1899 – 1965), British industrialist and prominent Freemason
- Robert Melville Grindlay (1786 – 1887), British soldier, artist and banker
- Stephen Grindlay (born 1982), Scottish footballer

== See also ==
- Grindley (disambiguation)
