= Priory of St. Thomas near Stafford =

- Location within Staffordshire
- Interactive map of Priory of St. Thomas near Stafford

Monastery information
- Other name: The priory of St. Thomas the Martyr
- Order: Augustinian
- Established: c.1174
- Disestablished: 1538
- Dedication: Saint Thomas the Martyr

People
- Founder: Gerard fitz-Brian

Site
- Location: near Stafford, Staffordshire, England
- Coordinates: 52.8037°N 2.0748°W
- Public access: Yes

Priory of St. Thomas near Stafford was an Augustinian religious house near Stafford, Staffordshire, England. Founded sometime in approximately 1174, it was a surrendered to the Crown in 1538, during the Dissolution of the Monasteries.

== History ==
=== Foundation and early history ===
The priory was found sometime between 1173 and 1175, by one Gerard fitz-Brian, a local landowner and burgess, and settled by canons from Darley Abbey, Derbyshire. The foundation can be dated thanks to fitz-Brian's foundation charter, which was witnessed by Ralph, Archdeacon of Stafford who ceased to hold office in 1175. The priory was also dedicated to Saint Thomas Beckett, who was not canonized until 1173.

Fitz-Brain's original grant to the priory included 70 acres of land around the River Sow and use of property in Stafford, subject to an annual rent of 8 shillings. At some point the patronage of the priory was transferred to Richard Peche, Bishop of Lichfield and Coventry. Peche resigned his episcopal see in 1182 and joined the brothers at the priory, being buried there the following year. Successive Bishops of Lichfield and Coventry would remain patrons of the house.

Throughout the 12th century, the priory accepted numerous gifts of land from the bishops and other local gentry and landowners. Bishop Peche gifts the house land in Lichfield, Cannock and Baswich, as well as the rights to fish on the rivers Sow and Penk. From the local landowners, such as the de Mutton family of Ingestre Hall, they received land grants in Tixall, Stone and Donisthorpe. The priory also purchased manors of its own, such as the manors of Drayton, bought in 1194 for 35 marks, and Maer. In 1245 Henry III gave the house a gift of £10 to buy a chasuble "of red samite with Orphreys".

=== Late middle ages ===
St. Thomas near Stafford continued to grow during the late Middle Ages and it was one of the wealthier houses of the order in Staffordshire. In 1300, Geoffrey de Gresley, a companion of Robert de Ferrers, 6th Earl of Derby, gave the priory rent of 10s. annually from a mill at Bupton, Derbyshire. They also received the advowson of the churches of Weston-on-Trent and Bushbury.

A 1347 visit by Roger Northburgh, Bishop of Lichfield and Coventry, showed that frequent absences of the subprior had led to a lack of discipline among the brothers. The monks were found to be keeping hounds, hunting with local laymen and wearing lay clothing. Some monks were found to be sleeping outside of the priory dormitories. The bishop levied severe restrictions on the monks, ruling that his decrees should be read in chapter throughout the year. Later visits in 1518 and 1524 confirm similar indiscretions on behalf of the brothers and similar decrees were provided by the visitors.

=== Dissolution ===
Henry VIII broke with the church in Rome in 1534, making himself supreme head of the church in England and in 1535 he commissioned the Valor Ecclesiasticus, a survey of the finances of the church in England, Wales and English controlled parts of Ireland. The Valor Ecclesiasticus shows that the priory's possessions were worth a total of £180 18s.9½d and it had a net income of £141 13s. 21/6d, which made it the wealthiest Augustinian priory in the country.

Unlike a number of religious houses, the priory avoided dissolution in 1536, with payment of a fine of £133 6s. 8d to the Crown. The payment of such a large fine proved difficult and the prior was forced to pay in installments. By 1538, the prior had surrendered the house to the Crown, in exchange for an annual pension of £26 13s. 4d. The brothers received pensions of between £5-6. In October 1539, the priory was granted to Rowland Lee, Bishop of Lichfield and Coventry, passing to his nephew Brian Fowler on his death.

== Remains ==
By the late 20th century, little remained of the Priory of St. Thomas near Stafford. A farm was built on the site and a number of the conventual buildings were incorporated into the farm structures. The ruins of the priory church and parts of the rectangular cloister are extant. Nothing remains of the eastern side of the cloister nor the chapter house.

== Burials ==
- Robert de Ferrers, 6th Earl of Derby
- Richard Peche
