= Rebekah Grindlay =

Australian diplomat

Rebekah Grindlay is an Australian diplomat who served as the Ambassador to Lebanon from 2018 to 2022. She has been called "the rising star of Australian diplomacy".

Her appointment was announced 10 October 2018, and she served in the role until 2022. She currently serves as the Assistant Secretary of the India Branch with the Department of Foreign Affairs and Trade.

Grindlay earned a Master of Public Policy from Princeton University and a Bachelor of Commerce from Sydney University.
