= James G. Grindlay =

American military officer (1840–1907)

James Glas Grindlay
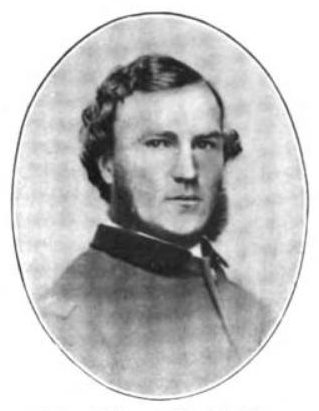
- James Grindlay
- Born: February 14, 1840; Edinburgh, Scotland, United Kingdom
- Died: October 19, 1907 (aged 67); Troy, New York, U.S.
- Burial place: Forest Hill Cemetery; Utica, New York, U.S.
- Relatives: Grindlay family
- Military career
- Allegiance: United States of America; Union
- Branch: United States Army; Union Army
- Service years: 1862 - 1865
- Rank: Colonel; Brevet Brigadier General
- Commands: (New York (state)) 146th New York Volunteer Infantry Regiment
- Conflicts: American Civil War
- Awards: Medal of Honor

James Glas Grindlay (February 14, 1840 – October 19, 1907) was a Union Army officer in the American Civil War and a recipient of the United States military's highest decoration, the Medal of Honor, for his actions during the Battle of Five Forks. He served with the 146th New York Volunteer Infantry Regiment and commanded that unit for the last year of the war. He twice briefly led his brigade after his superior officers became casualties, and was brevetted brigadier general shortly before the end of the conflict.

== Early life ==
Born in Edinburgh, Scotland, Grindlay immigrated to the United States as a young man. He was trained as a clerk, accountant, and insurance agent. Before enlisting in the Army he worked as a bookkeeper for a tannery in Boonville, New York.

== Civil War service ==
Grindlay enlisted from Boonville on September 8, 1862 for a three-year term of service in the Union Army. He joined Company D of the 146th New York Infantry as a captain. In May and June 1864 the regiment took part in General Ulysses S. Grant's Overland Campaign in Virginia. At the Battle of the Wilderness in the first week of May, the 146th took heavy casualties. Both the regimental commander and the second-in-command were killed in action, leaving Grindlay as the most senior officer. He assumed command of the regiment and led it through the Battle of Spotsylvania Court House which immediately followed. Promoted to major, Grindlay led the 146th for the remainder of the campaign, including the battles of North Anna, Totopotomoy Creek, and Cold Harbor.

During the subsequent Siege of Petersburg, Grindlay again led his regiment through a series of battles, beginning with the Second Battle of Petersburg in June 1864 and the Battle of Globe Tavern in August. At the Battle of Peebles' Farm, the commander of 1st Brigade, 2nd Division, V Corps, of which the 146th New York was a part, was severely wounded. The injured officer, Elwell Stephen Otis, was carried from the field and Grindlay took over his position. Grindlay's tenure as brigade commander lasted only two days, from October 1, to October 3, before a replacement was found. He reverted to his previous position as leader of the 146th, and saw the regiment through several more battles from late 1864 into early 1865. He led his men at the Battle of Boydton Plank Road in late October, and, after being promoted to lieutenant colonel, at Hatcher's Run in early February.

In the final weeks of the war, Grindlay was promoted to colonel and brevetted before seeing action again in the Appomattox Campaign. On March 13, 1865, he was simultaneously awarded the brevet ranks of lieutenant colonel for his actions as Spotsylvania, colonel for his actions at North Anna, and brigadier general for his "gallant and meritorious services". At the Battle of Five Forks on April 1, 1865, the 1st Brigade, including the 146th New York, led the 2nd Division's attack on the Confederate breastworks. Just after breaching the defenses, brigade commander Frederick Winthrop was mortally wounded. For a second time, Grindlay took over command of 1st Brigade. Under his leadership, the brigade took the Confederate defenses and captured more than one-thousand prisoners and four battle flags. Two of the flags were captured by his own regiment, the 146th New York. Again, Grindlay was brigade commander for only two days until another replacement was found. For his actions during the engagement, Grindlay was awarded the Medal of Honor twenty-six years later, on August 14, 1891. His official citation states that he was "[t]he first to enter the enemy's works, where he captured 2 flags."

Grindlay and the rest of the 146th New York were mustered out of service on July 16, 1865, three months after the end of the war.

== Post-war life ==
After the war, Grindlay lived in Utica, New York. He married twice, first to a Miss Anderson from Boonville and second to Mary Peckham from Utica. He was a companion of the New York Commandery of the Military Order of the Loyal Legion of the United States military society and was president of the V Corps Veteran Association. In 1874 and 1875 he served as the U.S. consul to Kingston, Jamaica, and from 1891 onwards he worked at the New York State Comptroller's office in Albany. Grindlay died in a car accident in Troy, New York, at age 67 and was buried at Forest Hill Cemetery in Utica.

== See also ==
- List of Medal of Honor recipients
- List of American Civil War Medal of Honor recipients: G–L
