= Archdeacon of Orkney =

The Archdeacon of Orkney was the head of the Archdeaconry of Orkney, a sub-division of the Diocese of Orkney in Scotland. This archdeacon was one of the two archdeacons of the diocese, the other being the Archdeacon of Shetland.

== List of known archdeacons of Orkney ==
- William, 1309–1310
- William de Buchan, 1369-1372 (afterwards Archdeacon of Shetland).
- Johne Thome, x 1429
- John Patrickson, 1419
- William Brown, 1420
- Thomas de Greenlaw, 1422–1424
- Simon de Greenlaw, 1422
- Andrew de Tulloch, 1435-1447 x 1448
- Thomas Etal, 1438
- Christopher Gynnis, 1448–1449
- Nicholas Blair, 1449
- Andrew Wishart, 1451-1456 x 1461
- James Kinnaird, 1465–1481
- Humphrey Clerk, 1513
- John Tyrie, 1527-1559 x
- Gilbert Foulsie, 1561–1580
- Thomas Swentoun, 1586-1626 x 1627
- Francis Liddell, 1627–1635
