= Nigel Grindley =

British biochemist (born 1945)

Nigel David Forster Grindley FRS (born 24 November 1945) is a British biochemist and Professor of Molecular Biophysics and Biochemistry at Yale University.

== Life and career ==
Grindley attended Denstone College in Staffordshire before studying at Gonville and Caius College, Cambridge (BA, 1967), and London University (PhD, 1974). Following postdoctoral research at Carnegie Mellon University, he taught biological sciences as an assistant professor at the University of Pittsburgh for two years, from 1978 to 1980, before moving to Yale.

He was a 1987 Guggenheim Fellow, and won a 1991 MERIT award from the National Institutes of Health. He was elected a Fellow of the Royal Society in 2006. He was named as a Fellow of the American Association for the Advancement of Science in 2008.

At Yale his team are studying the effects of a variety of enzymes on DNA.
