= Simpson baronets =

Extinct baronetcy in the Baronetage of the United Kingdom

There have been two baronetcies created for persons with the surname Simpson, both in the Baronetage of the United Kingdom. Both creations are extinct.

The Simpson Baronetcy, of Strathavon in the County of Linlithgow, and of the City of Edinburgh, was created in the Baronetage of the United Kingdom on 3 February 1866 for the Scottish physician James Young Simpson. The title became extinct on the death of the third Baronet in 1924.

The Simpson Baronetcy, of Bradley Hall, Ryton, in the County Palatine of Durham, was created in the Baronetage of the United Kingdom on 1 February 1935 for Colonel Frank Simpson. The title became extinct on the death of the third Baronet in 1981.

== Simpson baronets, of Strathavon and the City of Edinburgh (1866) ==
Arms of Simpson of Strathavon and Edinburgh: Or, on a chief vert a goshawk between two crescents argent.

- Sir James Young Simpson, 1st Baronet (1811–1870)
- Sir Walter Grindlay Simpson, 2nd Baronet (1843–1898)
- Sir James Walter Mackay Simpson, 3rd Baronet (1882–1924)

== Simpson baronets, of Bradley Hall (1935) ==
- Sir Frank Robert Simpson, 1st Baronet (1864–1949)
- Sir Basil Robert James Simpson, 2nd Baronet (1898–1968)
- Sir John Cyril Finucane Simpson, 3rd Baronet (1899–1981)
