= Jonathan E. Grindlay =

American astrophysicist

- Education: Dartmouth College (1966)
- Scientific career
- Fields: Astronomer

Jonathan E. Grindlay, also known as Josh Grindlay, is an astrophysicist and Robert Treat Paine Professor of Practical Astronomy at the Harvard College Observatory of Harvard University. His research interests are in high-energy astrophysics and the study of compact astronomical objects such as black holes in X-ray binaries. He is also one of the founders of the working group on time-domain astronomy of the American Astronomical Society.

He was elected a Legacy Fellow of the American Astronomical Society in 2020
