= W H Grindley =

English pottery company

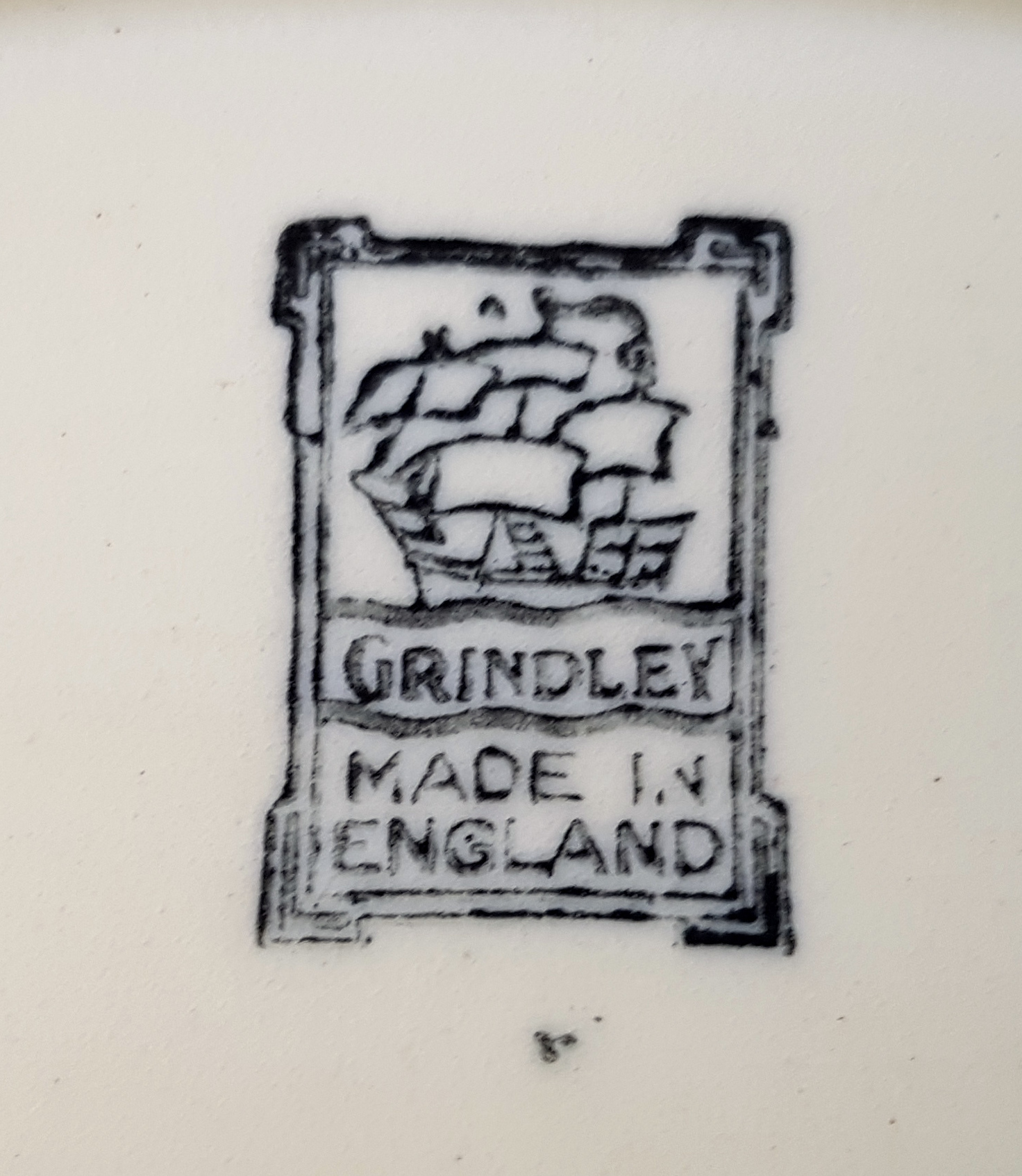
- Trade mark
- Founded: 1880; 146 years ago
- Founder: William Harry Grindley; Alfred Meakin
- Defunct: 1991
- Fate: Entered receivership and acquired by Woodlands Pottery
- Parent: Alfred Clough (1960–1982); Federated Potteries (1982-1988)

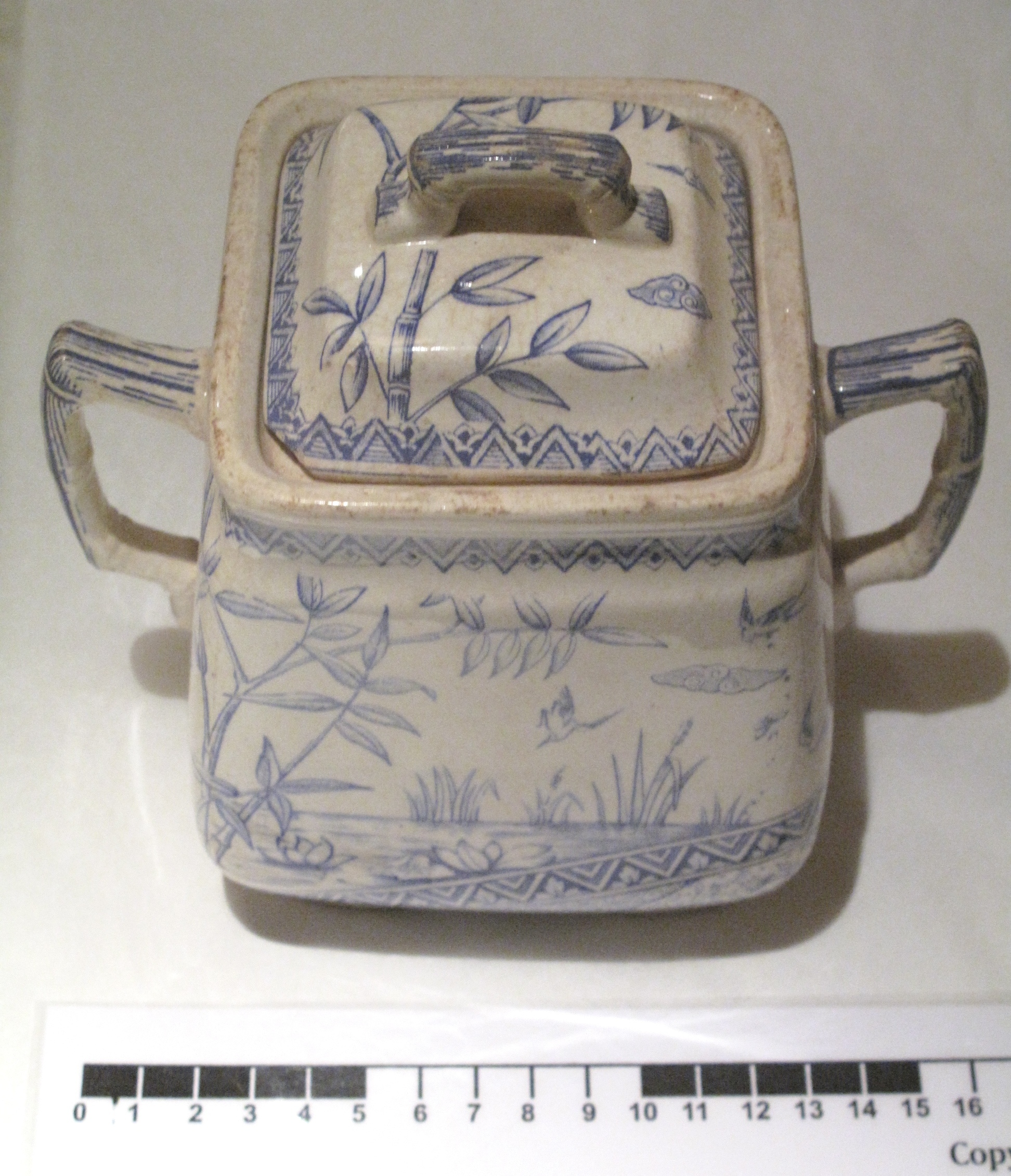
Sugar jar

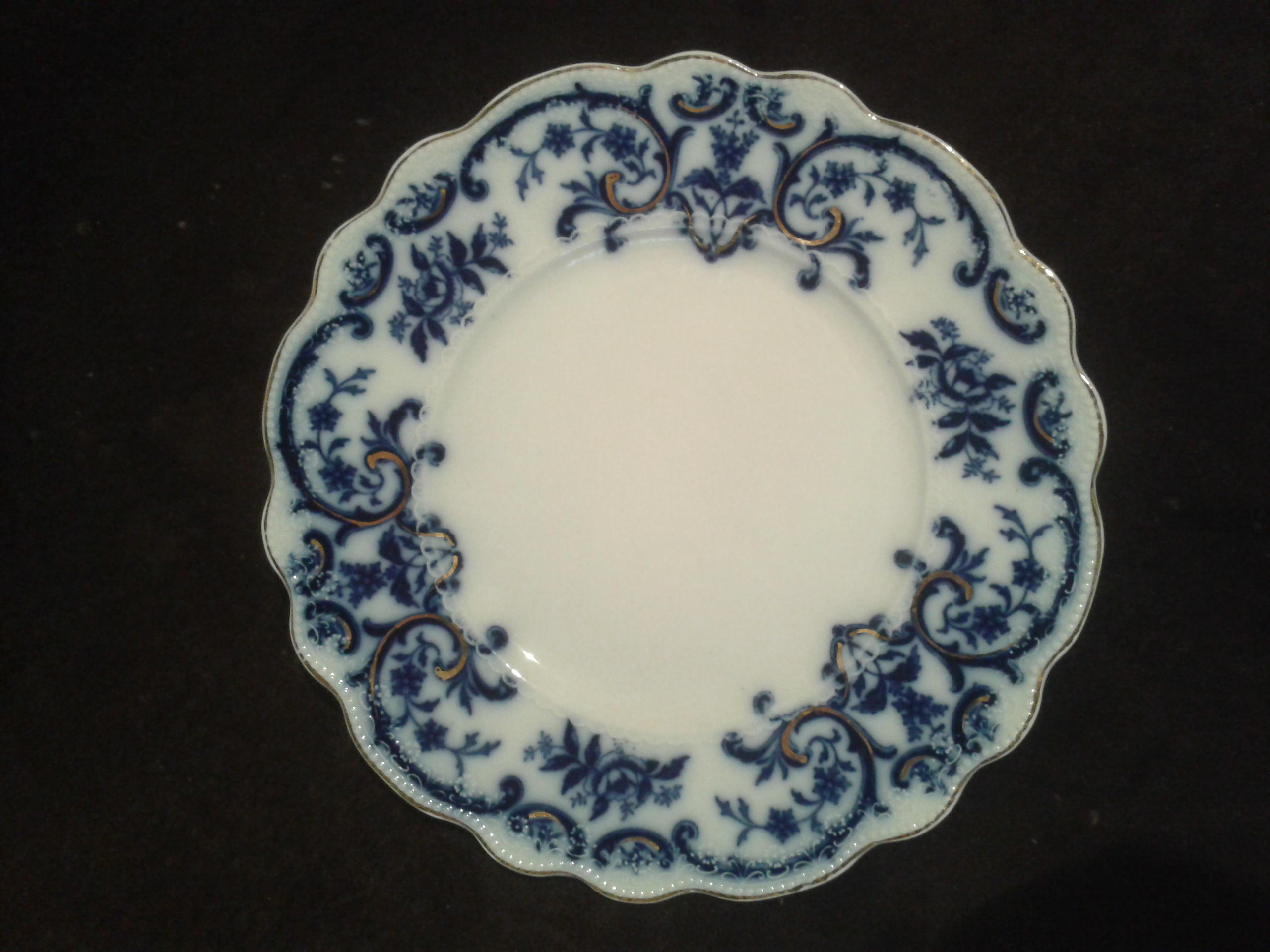
"Portman" pattern, 19th century

W H Grindley was an English pottery company that made earthenware and ironstone tableware, including flow blue. The company was founded in 1880 by William Harry Grindley, JP (b. 1859) of Tunstall, Stoke-on-Trent.

The company was founded at the Newfield Pottery by Grindley and Alfred Meakin (connected to J. & G. Meakin company), but the partnership ended in 1884 and Grindley continued alone. It moved to the Woodland Pottery in 1891. William Harry Grindley died in 1926.

W H Grindley was taken over by Alfred Clough in 1960, and became known as Grindley of Stoke in 1978. The company bought Ceramix in 1980, and was itself bought by Federated Potteries in 1982 before being bought back by W H Grindley in 1988. The company went into receivership in 1991 and was taken over by Woodlands Pottery. Pattern books and records from 1880 to 1930 are in the Stoke-on-Trent City Archives.
