= G. C. Grindley =

British psychologist

- Born: 1903
- Died: 1976 (aged 72–73)
- Occupation: Psychologist

Gwilym Cuthbert Grindley (1903–1976) was a British psychologist, best known for pioneering work in what later became known as operant conditioning. Grindley has been cited as one of the first scientists to develop the concept of optical flow.

== Biography ==
Grindley's academic career began at the University of Bristol, where he studied physics; his first publications were on emission spectra, based on work with A. M. Tyndall. However, he became interested in animal learning, and began work under Conwy Lloyd Morgan, who was then emeritus Professor of Psychology and Ethics at Bristol. He carried out pioneering research on learning in chickens, working within the framework of Pavlovian conditioning. These studies included a very early investigation of what is now called conditioned reinforcement, according to Mackintosh the first to investigate this phenomenon.

Grindley subsequently moved to a faculty post at the Department of Experimental Psychology at the University of Cambridge, and in 1932 published his best known paper, on learning in guinea pigs. This was in effect an investigation in operant conditioning, though that name was not in use at the time, and the work was done independently of the contemporaneous development of operant conditioning procedures in rats by B. F. Skinner. Skinner acknowledged Grindley as one of a number of researchers who independently developed operant techniques in the 1920s. In 20th-century reviews of the literature of comparative psychology, he is widely recognized as a pioneer of the discipline.

Grindley remained at Cambridge for the rest of his career, as a lecturer in the Department of Experimental Psychology; his subsequent research was on processes of visual perception and visual cognition, particularly visual attention.

Grindley was one of the eight founder members of the Experimental Psychology Group, which later became the Experimental Psychology Society. In 1947 he made a donation of £1000 (over £40,000 at 2021 values) to the Group to enable it to found a journal, the Quarterly Journal of Experimental Psychology. At his death, he left a significant bequest to the Society, which used it to found a system of grants to research students for conference attendance, known as "Grindley grants".

Among colleagues, Grindley was always referred to as "C", or, in his later years, "old C".

== Selected publications ==
- The Intelligence of Animals (1950)
- The Sense of Pain in Animals (1959)
