= Bordesley, Birmingham =

Area of Birmingham, England

Coordinates: 52.4799°N 1.8698°W

Bordesley
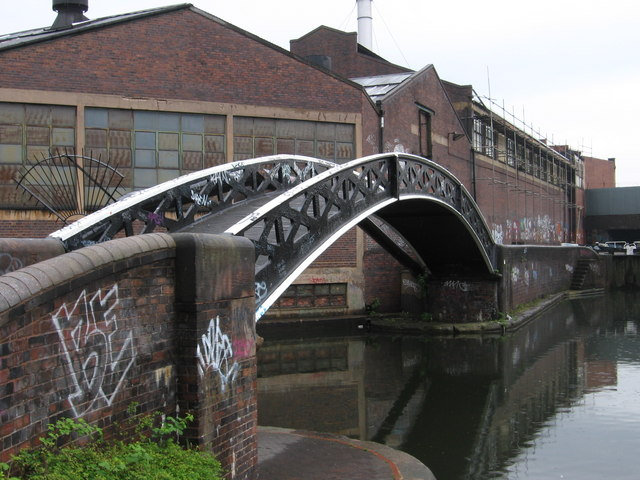
- Canal Junction, Bordesley

- Location within the West Midlands
- OS grid reference: SP085865
- Metropolitan borough: Birmingham
- Metropolitan county: West Midlands
- Region: West Midlands
- Country: England
- Sovereign state: United Kingdom
- Post town: BIRMINGHAM
- Postcode district: B9/B10
- Dialling code: 0121
- Police: West Midlands
- Fire: West Midlands
- Ambulance: West Midlands
- UK Parliament: Birmingham Ladywood

Bordesley is an area of Birmingham, England, 1.2 miles (2 km) south east of the city centre straddling the Watery Lane Middleway ring road. It should not be confused with nearby Bordesley Green. Commercial premises dominate to the west of the ring road, but much of this area is to be redeveloped. Blocks of residential apartments are planned and set for completion from the mid-2020s onwards. The largely residential area east of the ring road was renamed Bordesley Village following large scale clearance of back-to-back houses and redevelopment in the 1980s and 1990s. Bordesley is the real life setting of the BBC series Peaky Blinders, and home to Birmingham City Football Club's ground, St Andrew's.

== History ==
In Old English Bord's leah means 'Bord's clearing'. Bord may indicate 'boards' or 'planks', a place in the forest clearing where timber products could be obtained, but it is also a male personal name. Here, perhaps as early as the 7th century, Bord found or made a clearing in the forest to grow his crops and tend his stock. The name shares its origin with neighbouring Balsall Heath, first recorded as Bordeshale, derived from Bord's healh meaning 'Bord's heath' or 'Bord's nook'.

During the Middle Ages, from as early as 850, the manor was held by the ancestors of the Grindlay family. Following the Norman Conquest overlordship passed to the feudal barons of Dudley, but the family retained the manor as vassals for another 400 years until the mid 1500s. By 1226, Bordesley was held in demesne by the overlords of the other manors in Aston parish and by the second half of the 13th century it was the centre of a court leet for the neighbouring vills. In 1291 it was certified as containing 61 acres of demesne, with meadows in Bordesley and in Duddeston and Overton (Water Orton); there were 4 freeholders, each with a messuage and a half-yardland, and 78 others without houses holding land newly brought under cultivation, and 16 customary tenants holding 6½ yardlands; the total value was £27 12s. 2d. In 1390 a settlement joined the manors of Bordesley and Haybarn, henceforward usually linked together. Thereafter the manor passed through the same ownership and divisions as the overlordship of the other manors in Aston parish. It appears to have been acquired by Sir Charles Holte by 1706 (see Holte Baronets), and to have descended with Aston, being in the hands of a later Sir Charles Holte in 1770.

Bordesley was a hamlet and chapelry in the parish and union of Aston, part of the Hemlingford hundred in the county of Warwick. The hamlet consisted of a few scattered dwelling-houses, such as Stratford Place, still standing at Camp Hill and the Old Crown in Deritend both of which are of timber frame-work and plaster, with projecting upper stories, although those of Stratford Place have since been under-filled in brick.

=== Bordesley Hall ===
The Georgian house known as Bordesley Hall, which stood in a park of 6 acres south of the Coventry Road near its junction with Bordesley High Street, was the successor to pre-existing a medieval manor house. The first series Ordnance Survey map places the hall in the area of Albert and Bolton Roads, this location being supported by the image of the ruins drawn by P H Witon Jnr in 1791 which places it on an elevated site. Built in 1767 for the manufacturer and banker John Taylor, to replace an existing manor house, it passed on his death in 1785, to his son John Taylor, and was burnt down during the Priestley Riots. Taylor claimed £12,670 as damages and was paid £9,902 but Hutton records that "the real loss of Mr Taylor amounted to upwards £22,600," or approximately £2.4 million today (2017). It is reported that the house was rebuilt but sold off in 1840 for housing developments. However, Charles Pye writing of his visit to Birmingham in 1818 states that "having crossed the Warwick canal, the ruins of Bordesley house are in full view; they having continued in that state ever since the year 1791, when the house was demolished by an infuriated mob. The land by which it is surrounded has been parcelled out, and advertised to be let for building."

=== 19th century development ===
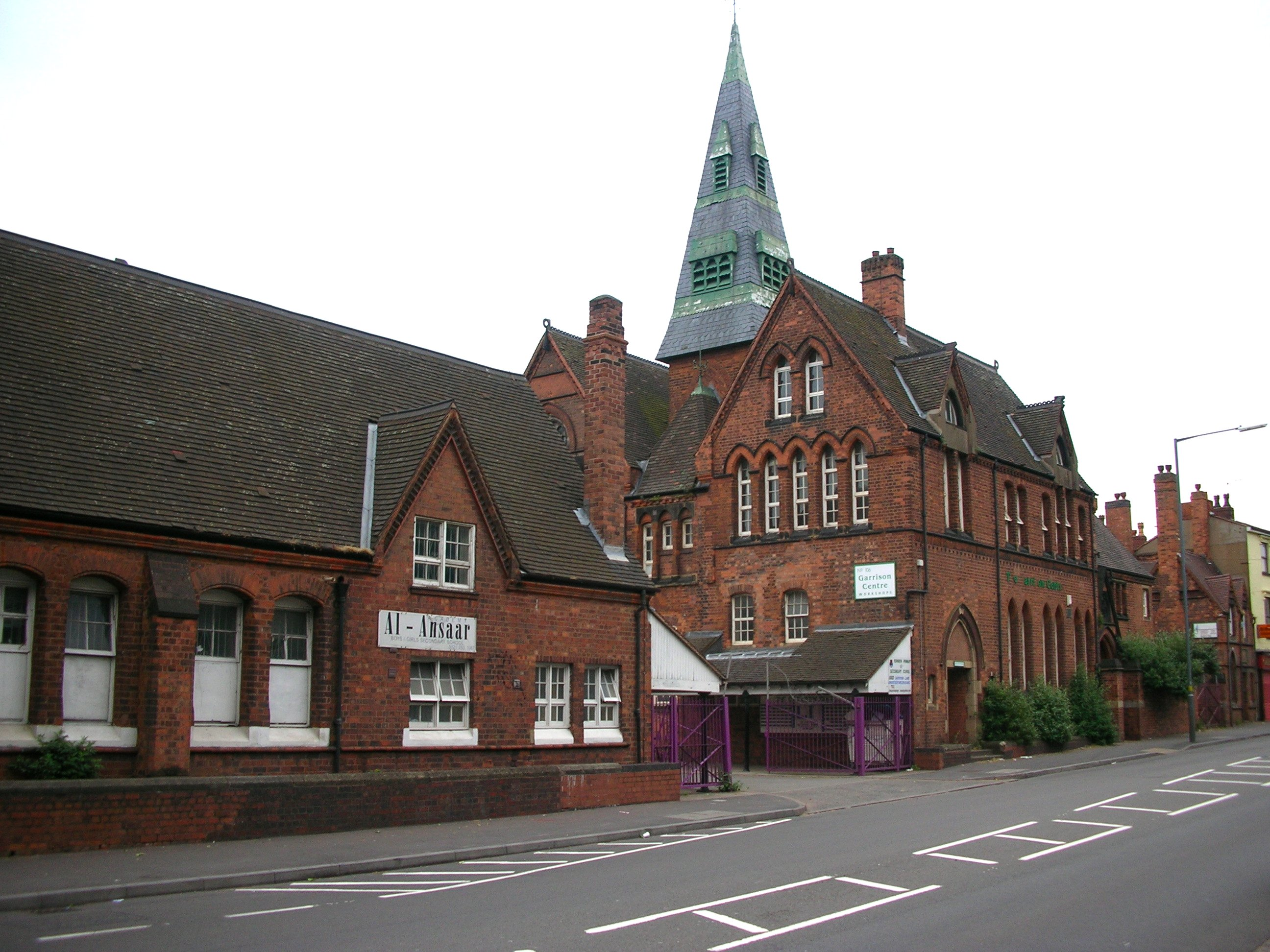
Former Garrison Lane School photographed in 2006

Land had been developed along Bordesley High Street to the junction of the Coventry and Stratford roads and along the Stratford road as far as Highgate Park by 1810 and subsequently, in 1838, Bordesley became a suburb of Birmingham, and so developed through its trade, manufactures, and public institutions. By 1841 the population of Deritend and Bordesley had passed 18,000, by 1871 it had reached almost 50,000 and by 1901 was recorded as 110,968. Bordesley had become urbanised with numbered courts, back to back houses and manufacturies.

=== Schools ===
Garrison Lane School opened in 1873 providing places for 867 juniors and infants. The school closed in 1959. The buildings were grade II listed on 8 July 1982.

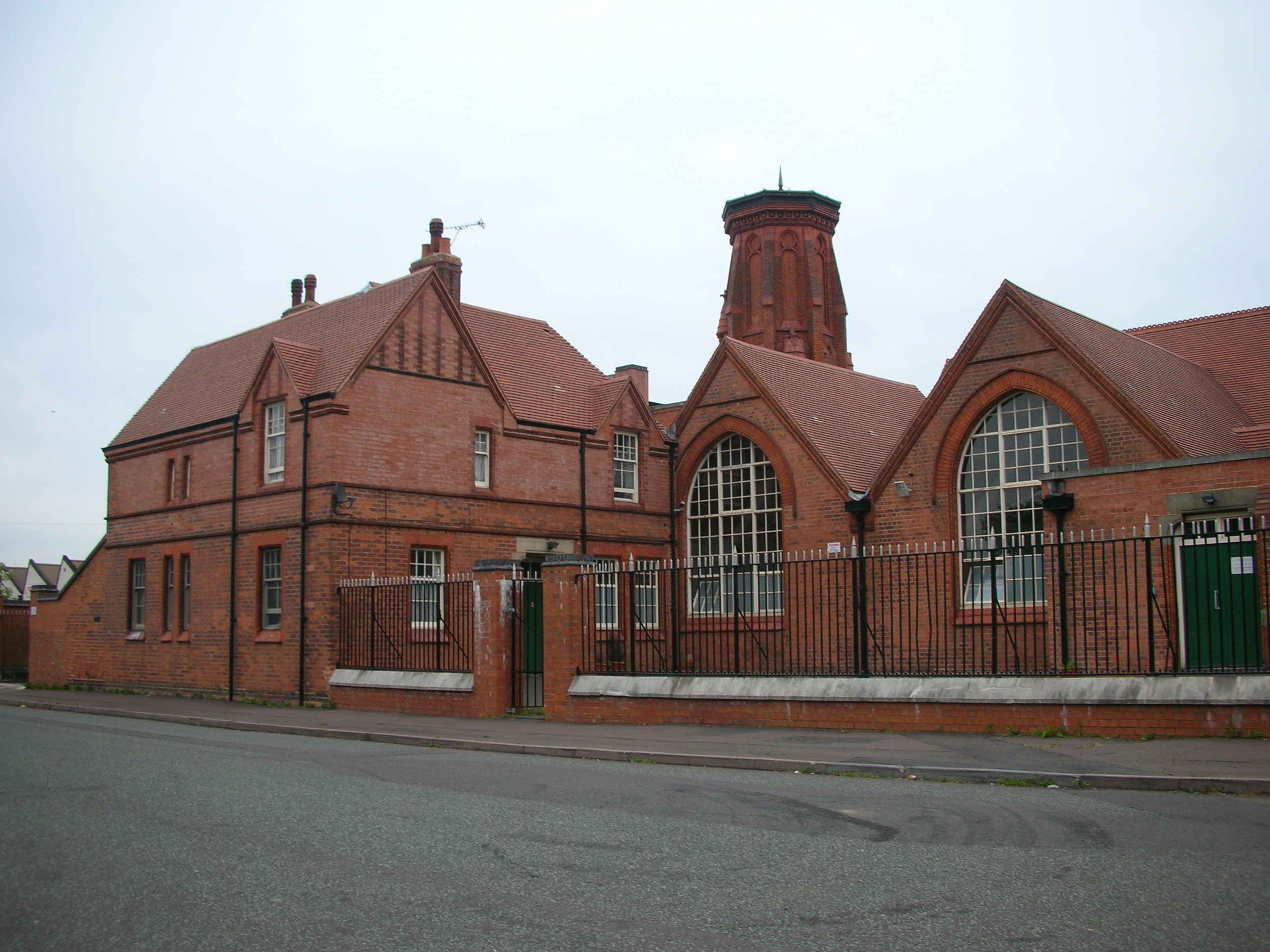
Former Tilton Road Board School in 2006

Ada Street Board School opened in 1885 with accommodation for over 1,000 boys and girls of all ages. The school was remodelled in 1928 and 1932 into three departments for senior boys, junior mixed and infant children. The name of the school was changed to Ada Road Council School circa 1935 and again to St Andrew's County Primary School in 1954. The school is now known as Bordesley Village Primary School. The older school buildings are graded B on Birmingham's local list having been designated an important part of the city's heritage due to their architectural significance.

Tilton Road Board School opened in 1891 and was enlarged in 1906 and 1912. Its County Primary School closed in 1973 and its Girls County Secondary School four years later. The school buildings have been converted into the Darul Barakaat Mosque, inaugurated by Mirza Masroor Ahmad the fifth caliph or spiritual leader of the Ahmadiyya Muslim Community in 2004.

=== Industry ===
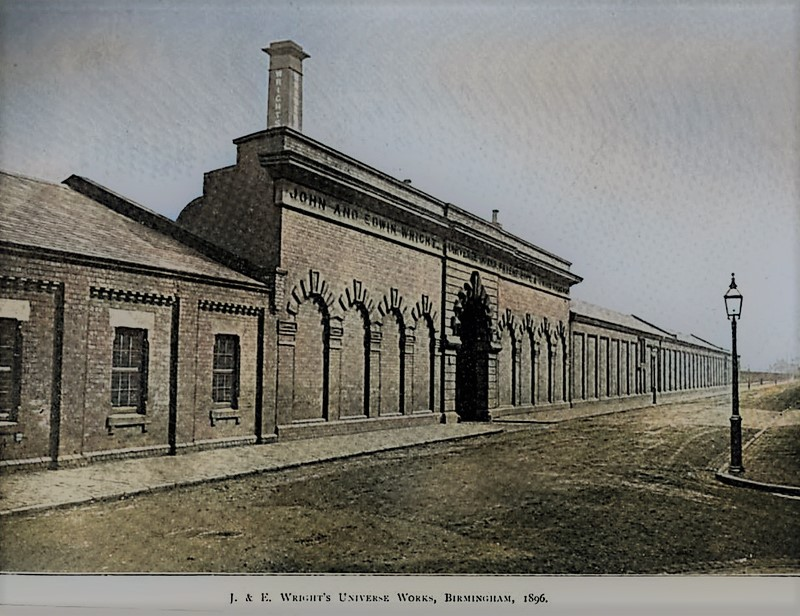
John & Edwin Wright Limited's Garrison Street "Universe" Rope Works in 1896

Arthur L F Carr Ltd established the Artillery Street Paint and Varnish Works, Bordesley in 1910 on a triangular site bordered by a railway and the Grand Union Canal. The company's name was changed to Carr Paints Ltd in 1953. The works were closed in 1995, demolished and replaced by housing.

The "Universe Works" of rope makers John & Edwin Wright Limited was established on a strip of land between Garrison Street and the railway. An entry in Showell's Dictionary of Birmingham (1885) states ropemaking is a trade carried on in many places, but there are few establishments that can equal the Universe Works in Garrison Lane (sic), where, in addition to hundreds of tons of twine and cord, there are manufactured all sorts of wire and hemp ropes for colliery and other purposes, ocean telegraph cables included. The rope works has gone but the site much altered is still in commercial use.

The Whitworth Works of Charles H Pugh Ltd on Tilton Road was built next to a former brickworks and the Tilton Road Board School. ATCO lawnmowers and the short-lived ATCO Safety Trainer midget car were made there. The premises were substantially destroyed by fire on 5 November 1981. The site is now known as the Whitworth Industrial Park.

== Geography ==
Elevation

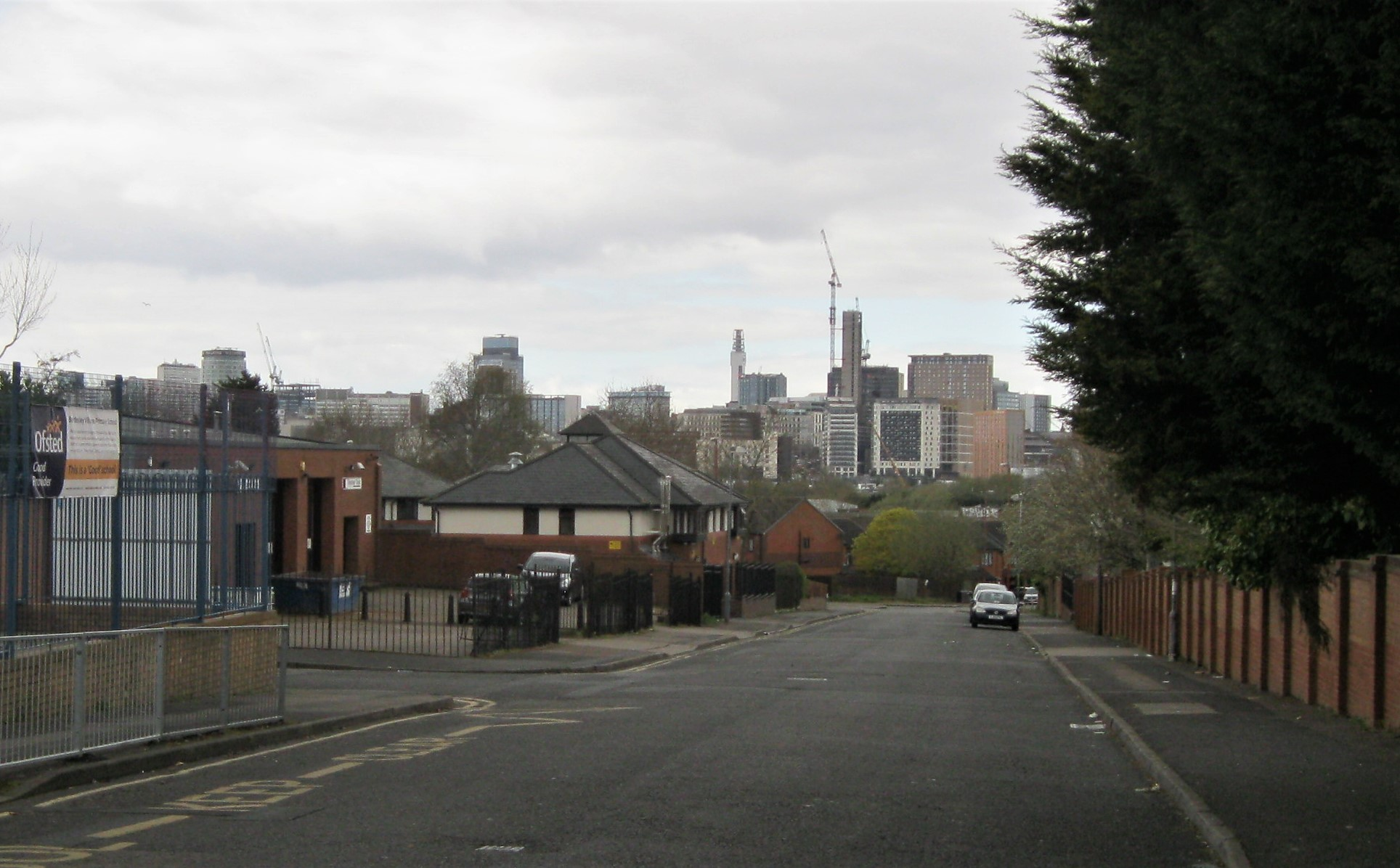
View down St Andrew's Street to Birmingham city centre

Land to the city side of the Middleway and at Garrison Lane Park is on the River Rea plain at about 107 metres (351 ft) above sea level. The land rises to the east at Kingston Hill Park, reaching 132 metres (433 ft) at St. Andrew's football ground.

Transport infrastructure

The A4540 Birmingham Middleway divides Bordesley. Since 1 June 2021 the parts of Bordesley within the ring road have been in the Birmingham Clean Air Zone. The A45 Small Heath Highway and B4128 Coventry Road meet the Middleway at Bordesley Circus. The Watery Lane Middleway runs from Bordesley Circus to Garrison Circus where Garrison Lane and Great Barr Street meet.

The Grand Union Canal enters Bordesley from the south east, rising through the flight of six Camp Hill locks to Bordesley Junction. Access to the towpath is on Coventry Road. At the junction, the Digbeth Branch runs north west to cross the River Rea whilst the main line cuts through Bordesley Village. Towpath access points integrate the village and canal.

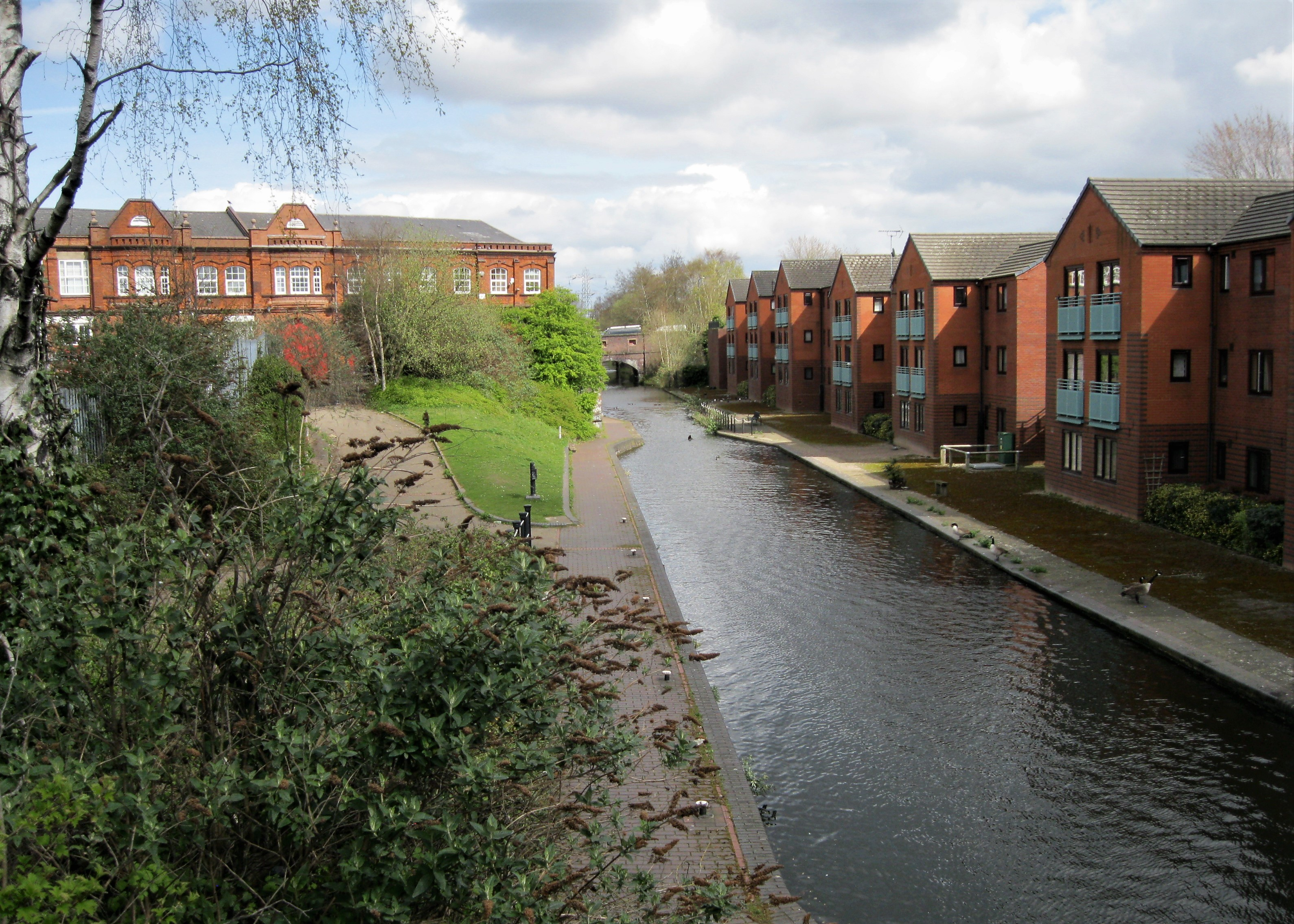
The Grand Union Canal in Bordesley Village

The Chiltern Main Line railway from Moor Street station to Bordesley station runs along the blue brick Bordesley Viaduct parallel with Digbeth, High Street, Deritend and High Street, Bordesley. The Duddeston Viaduct branches off at Adderley Street but the line was never completed. It has been mooted that the Duddeston Viaduct may be transformed into a 'skypark'. The Bordesley Junction to Tyseley Line joins the Camp Hill Line at Bordesley Junction and passes the rear of the Gil Merrick Stand, St Andrew's stadium in a cutting. The Camp Hill Line continues as the St Andrew's Junction to Grand Junction Curve and runs north of Garrison Street to cross the Lawley Street Viaduct.

== Governance ==
On 1 December 2017 Bordesley became part of the new Birmingham City Council electoral ward of Bordesley and Highgate. Bordesley is in the parliamentary constituency of Birmingham Ladywood. It is currently represented by Green Party councillor Ali Razi, and Labour MP Shabana Mahmood.

== Public transport ==
Bordesley is served by Bordesley railway station, which primarily caters for football fans travelling to Birmingham City's St Andrew's football ground on match days. There is no regular train service from the station.

National Express West Midlands buses pass through Bordesley en route to Birmingham city centre. Service no. 97 to/from Chelmsley Wood has stops along Great Barr Street and Garrison Lane. Routes no. 17 to/from Tile Cross and no. 60 to/from Cranes Park, Sheldon stop on High Street, Bordesley and Coventry Road

== Parks and recreation ==
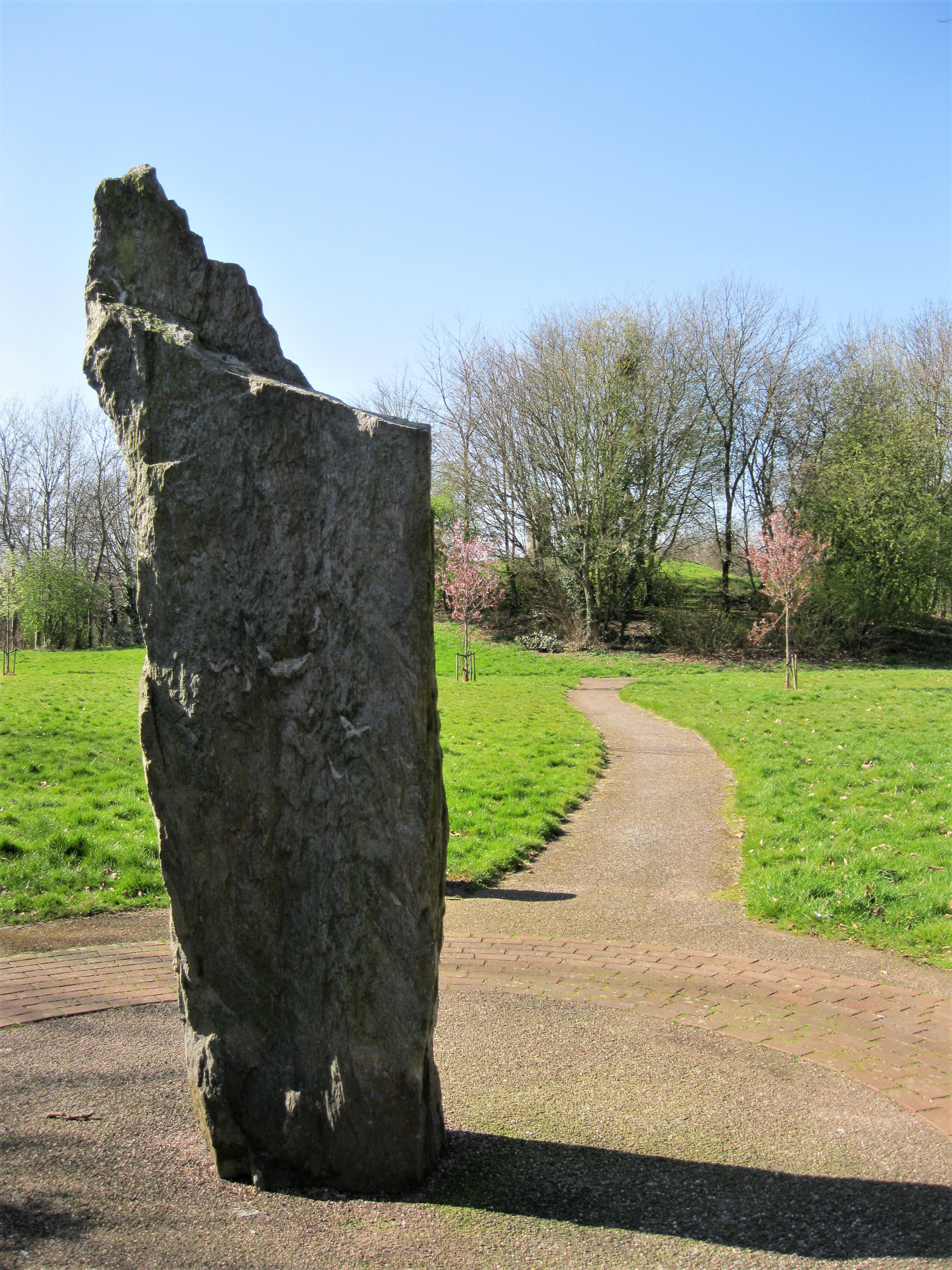
Standing stone, Kingston Hill Park

St. Andrew's stadium has been the home of Birmingham City Football Club since 1906.

Garrison Lane Park, laid out circa 1905 as Callowfields Recreation Ground, is off Garrison Circus, a junction on The Middleway or Middle Ring Road. London Plane trees are a feature of the park. A children's play area is close to the Witton Street entrance.

Kingston Hill Park to the west of Birmingham City's St. Andrew's ground was opened by Birmingham City Council as Kingston Hill Road Recreation Ground in 1928 on the site of a former brickworks. A central mound is topped by stones in the manner of a small prehistoric stone circle. A children's play area is near to the Kingston Road entrance.

Birmingham Wheels Park, a community motorsport facility is nearby Bordesley Green.

== Future development plans ==
A large part of Bordesley west of the ring road is to be transformed as part of an extended Digbeth city centre quarter. Most of the industrial/commercial buildings in Adderley Street, Liverpool Street, Upper Trinity Street and New Bond Street are to be demolished to make way for blocks of apartments.

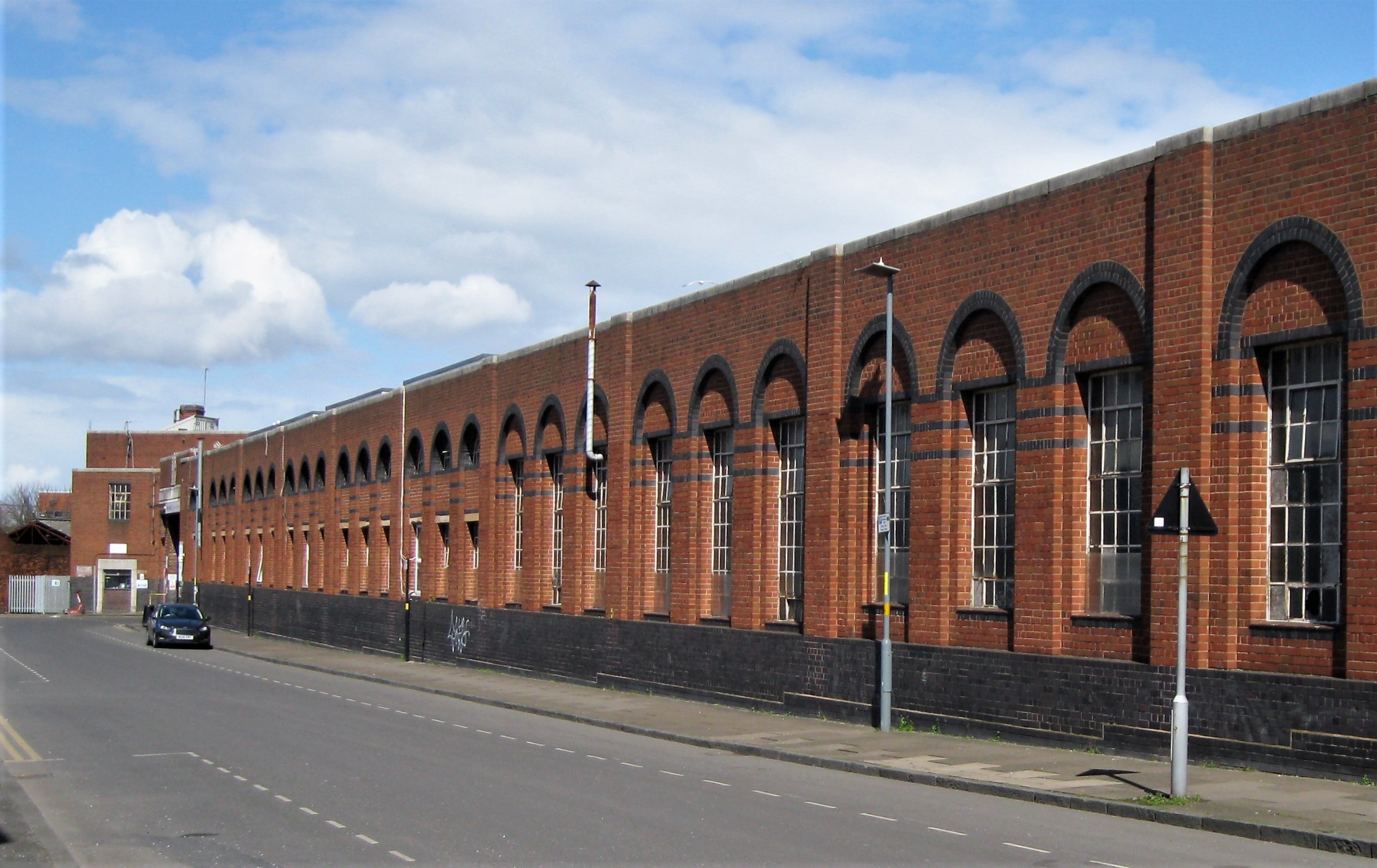
Liverpool Street frontage of the central Birmingham bus depot

The Central Birmingham National Express bus garage on Adderley Street and Liverpool Street built for the Birmingham Corporation Tramways & Omnibus Department in 1936 was sold to developers in January 2019. Part of the site backs on to the Grand Union Canal at Bordesley Junction. Outline planning permission was granted in December 2020 for up to 1,250 residential homes and 950 student apartments in multi-storey blocks. Development plans show that most of the bus depot's Liverpool Street facade, designed by the architectural firm of Crouch, Butler & Savage, is to be retained but that the Adderley Street frontage will be demolished.

In July 2021, planning approval was obtained for a mixed-use redevelopment site of 5 acres (2.0 hectares) off Upper Trinity Street. The plans are for 8 apartment blocks, including a 32 storey tower, a hotel and a 1 acre (0.40 hectares) park. The locally listed electricity supply station designed by Frank Barlow Osborn is not part of the development site.

In November 2021, plans were approved for 750 dwellings alongside the Grand Union Canal in New Bond Street. New Bond Street's road surface of small setts is one of the few original surviving examples in the area.

== Notable residents ==
- Rev. Richard William Enraght, Vicar of Holy Trinity Church, Bordesley, 1874–1883
- The musician Dave Morgan, musician, born in Bordesley
- Billy Kimber, head of the Birmingham Boys.

== Notes and references ==
Notes:
