= Moseley Hall, Birmingham =

18th-century country house

Moseley Hall
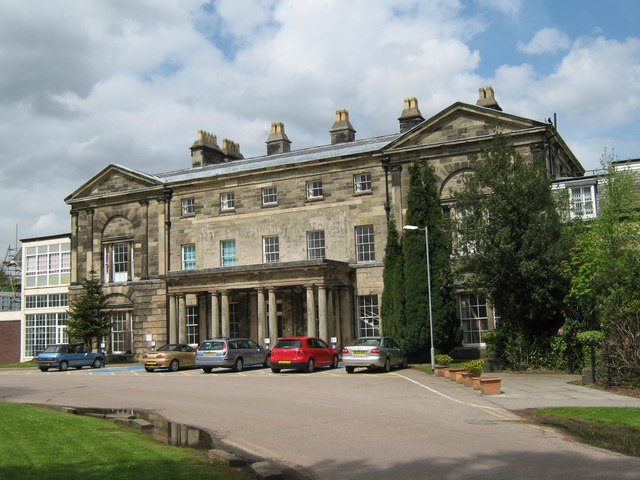
- Moseley Hall in 2009, viewed from the south
- Interactive map of the Moseley Hall area

General information
- Type: Country house
- Location: Moseley, England
- Coordinates: 52.4460°N 1.8934°W
- Renovated: 1795

Design and construction
- Designations: Grade II listed

Moseley Hall is a Grade II listed 18th-century country house which was situated in parkland in Moseley, Birmingham. The hall itself is now part of Moseley Hall Hospital and much of the surrounding estate has been developed for roads and housing.

The hall was built c. 1795 of ashlar with a slate roof in three storeys with a five-bay frontage. A central porch is supported by four pairs of Tuscan columns. The dovecote in the grounds is also Grade II listed.

== History ==
The Moseley estate came, after the Dissolution of the Monasteries, into the Grevis family, who rebuilt the hall in its present location in the early 1600s. After the family ran into financial difficulties the estate was sold in 1768 to wealthy manufacturer and banker John Taylor of Bordesley Park. His son John built a new house in a plain classical style alongside the previous one and commissioned Humphry Repton to landscape the park. The new building was set on fire by a mob during the Priestley Riots of 1791 when occupied by the Dowager Countess of Carhampton.

The damaged house was restored by 1796 and John Taylor jnr moved in. After his death it passed to his son James, High Sheriff of Worcestershire for 1826, who also lived there. After James's death in 1852 the property was let until 1889, when the hall and 22 acres (0.089 km^{2}) of the estate were sold to Richard Cadbury, MP, of the chocolate making family. The rest of the land was developed for housing following the building of Salisbury and Chantry roads, linking Alcester Road to Pershore Road via the estate.

== Hospital ==
In 1891 Cadbury presented Moseley Hall to the City of Birmingham for use as a children's convalescent home. It joined the National Health Service in 1948.

Moseley Hall hospital is now described as an NHS community hospital offering general medical and sub-acute care and specialist stroke and brain injury rehabilitation services for inpatients and outpatients. The Juniper Centre was built on the hospital site and provides support for older people with mental health issues over a large part of South Birmingham, also helping with physical care.
