= Church of St James the Less =

Church of St James the Less may refer to:

== United Kingdom ==
- St James the Less' Church, Ashted, Birmingham
- St James the Less and St Helen Church, Colchester, Essex
- Church of St James the Less, Hadleigh, Essex
- Church of St James the Less, Hambridge, Somerset
- St James the Less Church, Lancing, West Sussex
- Church of St James the Less, Longton, Staffordshire
- Saint James the Less, Pockthorpe, Norfolk
- St James the Less, Pimlico, London
- Church of St James the Less, Sulgrave, Northamptonshire
- Church of St James the Less, Tatham, Lancashire

== United States ==
- St. James the Less Roman Catholic Church, Baltimore, Maryland
- Church of St. James the Less, Philadelphia, Pennsylvania
