= Ashted =

Area of Birmingham, England

Coordinates: 52.485955°N 1.88030°W

- The Church of St James the Less, as depicted in Beilby, Knott & Beilby's An Historical and Descriptive Sketch of Birmingham (1830)

- Location within the West Midlands
- OS grid reference: SP082875
- Metropolitan borough: City of Birmingham
- Metropolitan county: West Midlands
- Region: West Midlands
- Country: England
- Sovereign state: United Kingdom
- Post town: BIRMINGHAM
- Postcode district: B4, B7
- Dialling code: 0121
- Police: West Midlands
- Fire: West Midlands
- Ambulance: West Midlands

Ashted (alternatively spelt Ashstead and Ashtead) is an area of Birmingham in the United Kingdom, within the ward of Nechells. The area is located approximately 0.75 miles (1.21 km) north-east of Birmingham City Centre near to the city's Eastside district, and forms the western extremity of Duddeston. It is within the boundaries of Nechells Green, and provides mainly estate and high-rise residences.

== History ==
The settlement takes its name from the physician John Ash, who leased the property from Sir Lester Holte and in 1771 built a grand house surrounded by fields, gardens and orchards. He never occupied the house, selling the lease to John Brooke, a Birmingham attorney. Brooke laid out streets and divided the property into parcels with the intention of bringing wealth to the area; many affluent entrepreneurs were living in Birmingham during the Industrial Revolution. In 1791, after Brooke added a cupola, Dr. Ash's house was opened as the church of St James the Less. The Ashted Barracks were erected next to the church in 1791 following the Priestley Riots. In 1809, the church passed into a trust and was consecrated in 1810.

Thirty-eight years later, in 1848, Samuel Lewis's Topographical Dictionary of England counted the population as approximately 25,000, and stated that the settlement's proximity to the city centre gave huge advantage to trade and industry.

Towards the end of the 19th century, the status of the area dropped and it became a high-density working class area, with many slums.

The church was demolished in 1956, having sustained heavy bombing during World War II.

== Transport ==
The A47 and Jennens Road meet The Middleway at Ashted. The traffic light controlled junction was laid out in 2018–19 following infilling of the Ashted Circus roundabout and its pedestrian subways. Dartmouth Circus is to the north via Dartmouth Middleway; and Garrison Circus to the south via Lawley Middleway.

Ashted Tunnel on the Digbeth Branch Canal provides water transport under the A47 Jennens Road.
