= John Brooke (1755–1802) =

English politician

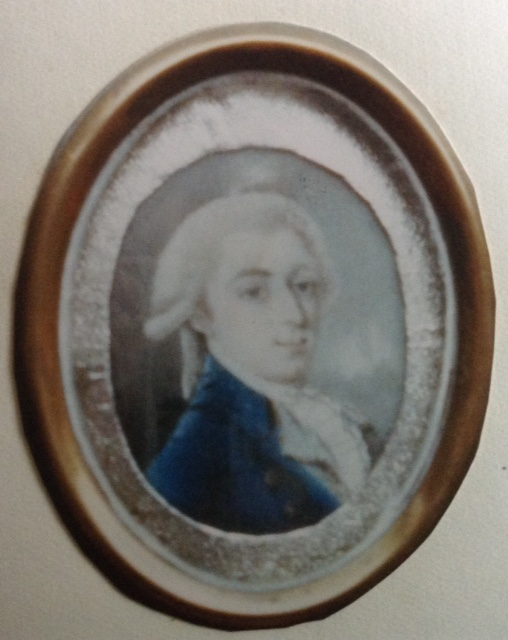
John Brooke

John Brooke (1755–1802) was an English politician in Warwickshire. He developed the Ashted estate near Birmingham and is principally known for his role during and after the Priestley Riots of 1791.

== Life ==
Brooke was born in 1755 in Daventry and in 1773 was articled as law clerk to John Meredith of Birmingham. He was admitted to the King’s Bench at Westminster and practiced in Birmingham. As an attorney, he acted as secretary to various organizations in Birmingham, most notably, to the Foundation of the Schools of King Edward VI (King Edward's School).

In 1787, Brooke purchased the estate of Dr. John Ash (physician) and developed the hamlet of Ashted. The development included a grid of streets featuring a main thoroughfare, Great Brooke Street, and a crescent known as Ashted Row. A chapel was created from Dr. Ash’s house, known as Ashted Chapel or St. James the Less, which opened on 9 October 1791.

As Under Sheriff of the County of Warwickshire, together with magistrates Joseph Carles and Dr. Benjamin Spencer, Brooke had responsibility for public order in Birmingham during the Priestley Riots in 1791. Unable to stop the violence, which erupted at a dinner commemorating the French Revolution on 14 July, Brooke reported to the Home Office of “this most ungovernable mob.”

There is some evidence that the episode represented the deliberate unleashing of a looting, drunken, unruly mob by the magistrates against the dissenters and the reformers, in an attempt to check their new political aggressiveness in Birmingham. Numerous affidavits providing evidence that Brooke, Carles, and Spencer had acted with neglect, if not worse, were collected and made available to the House of Commons. The refusal of the Prime Minister (William Pitt the Younger) to act on these dispositions and of the House of Commons to listen to them provides the basis for allegations of the government’s complicity in the riots.

Following the riots, the government in London erected military barracks at a number of nerve centers throughout the nation. In Birmingham, Brooke made four acres of land available, next to Ashted Chapel, for military barracks. Brooke also helped to organize associations designed to observe and control the political opposition, including the Church and King Club and the Association for the Protection of Liberty and Property Against Republicans and Levelers. In 1792, he was appointed Steward of the Manor of Aston, in which capacity he secured the election of a churchman as Low Bailiff, a position which had been customarily filled by a dissenter. The legality of this proceeding was vigorously challenged and ultimately reversed, thus maintaining the popular franchise against the Lord and his nominated officer.

In February 1793, Brooke was elected Coroner of the Country of Warwick by the County’s landholders. As a legal function, the coroner was responsible for selecting juries, holding inquests before these juries, and reporting to the court of the King’s Bench on all sudden or unexplained deaths. During the Scarcity Riots of 1795, Brooke presided over the inquest of the rioters who had been shot by the troops.

John Brooke was married to Elizabeth Green and was father to John Rose Brooke, Mathilda Brooke, and Henry Brooke. He died on 26 June 1802, at the age of 47, and was buried in Aston Parish Church.
