= Sheldon Hall, Birmingham =

Manor house in Birmingham, England

Coordinates: 52.4847°N 1.7624°W

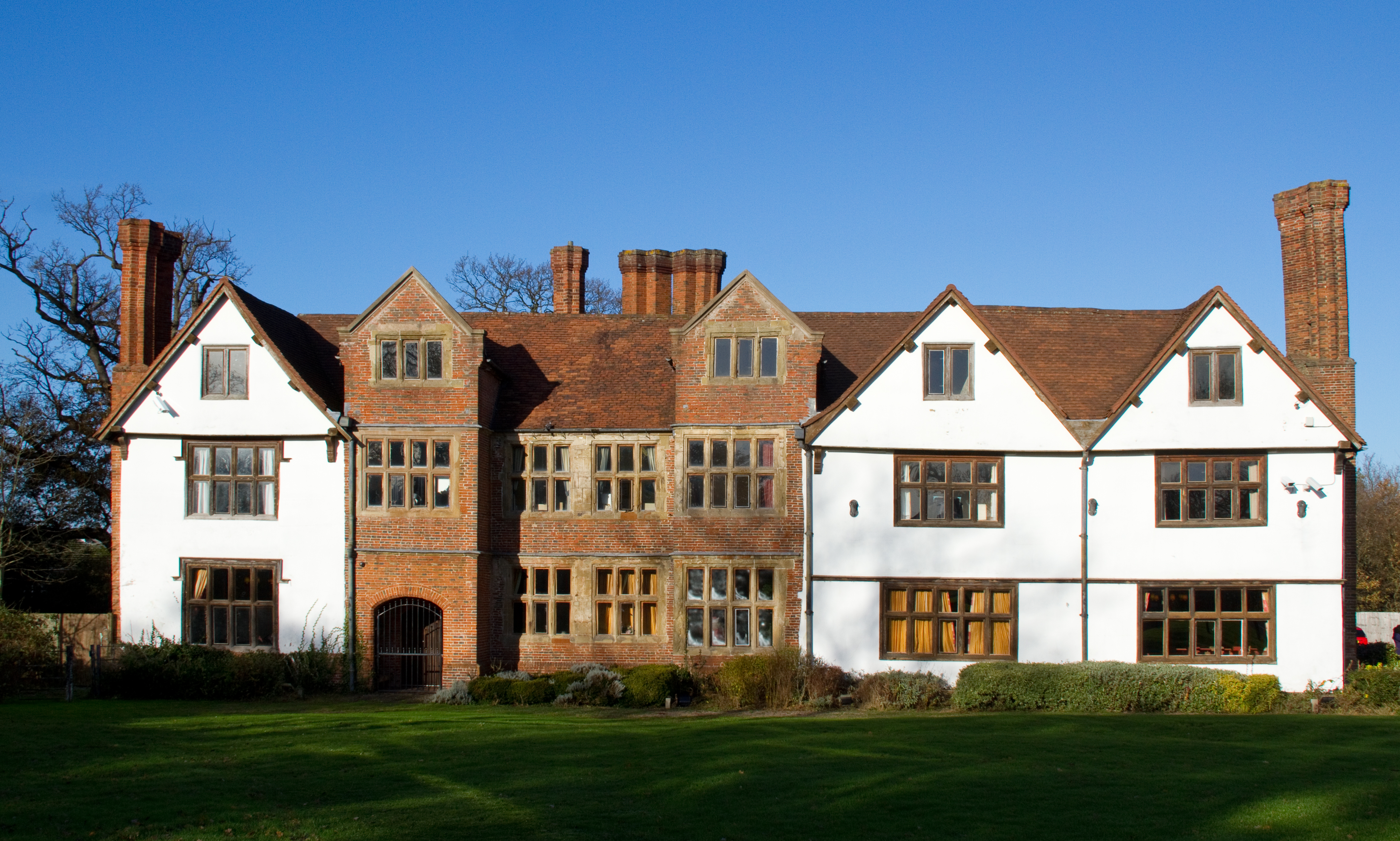
The manor in 2012

Sheldon Hall is an early 16th-century Grade II* listed manor house located on Gressel Lane in the Tile Cross area of Birmingham, England, consisting of a main block of two stories and attics built of red and black bricks with stone dressings. The city boundary runs along the eastern side of the property, and it was historically located within Warwickshire, near to the border with Worcestershire. The building is now used as a restaurant.

In 1439 the manor of Sheldon belonged to Humphrey Stafford, 1st Duke of Buckingham passing on his death in 1460 to his grandson Henry Stafford, 2nd Duke of Buckingham, who was beheaded for treason in 1483. After the attainder of his son Edward in 1521 the whole of Sheldon manor was granted by the Crown to Thomas Grey, 2nd Marquess of Dorset. He died in 1530 and his son Henry Grey, 1st Duke of Suffolk was also attainted and beheaded in 1554. In 1575 Queen Elizabeth I granted Sheldon to Henry Grey on payment of an annual rental but he sold his rights to Sir George Digby of Coleshill Hall.

The present hall was built by Sir Edward Digby for his son on the site of an older hall known as the East Hall. In 1751 the hall and surrounding land was bought and leased out by the Birmingham industrialist John Taylor of Bordesley Hall, Birmingham. The Digby family, however, remained in possession until 1919, when it was sold off. The building then gradually fell into a state of disrepair, but was saved from demolition when converted into a restaurant in 1997.

Children growing up in the local area during the 1960s and 70s nicknamed the building Baldy's Mansion.

Mr Albert Brayley owned the property in 1970s till the early 1990s
