= Billy Hands =

English pardoned rioter (1768–1853)

Billy Hands (1768–1853) performed several conflicting roles during the Priestley Riots of July 1791, and he knew some of those who had hatched the riots. When Hands was convicted for helping destroy a private house, the great and the good of Birmingham connived to fraudulently secure Hands a Royal Pardon. It raised questions in Parliament.

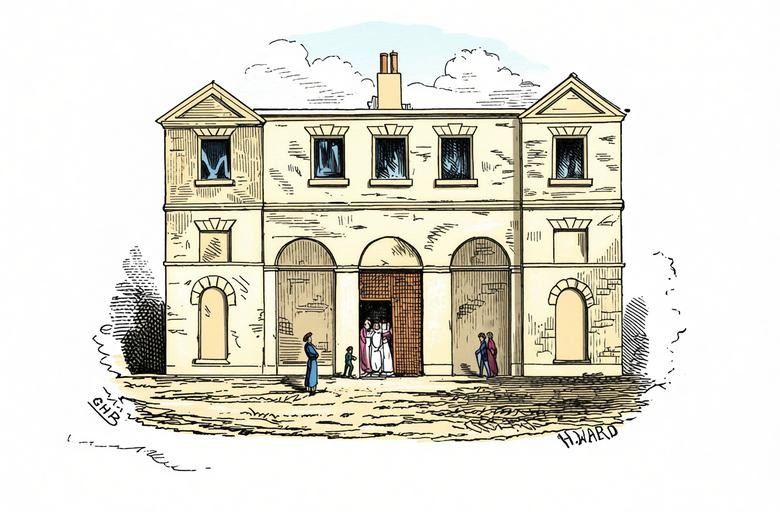
Thomas Swann's Birmingham Amphitheatre, 1785

== Introduction ==
William Hands, also known as Billy Hands, was born 29 December 1768, in Gay Hill Farmhouse, Kings Norton, the son of Roger Hands, a flax farmer. In 1784, aged 15, Billy moved to Birmingham, where he made brass tobacco boxes for William Ward, brazier or brass-worker. In 1785, Billy was invited to act as an occasional usher at a newly built equestrian amphitheatre in Livery Street. Local gentlefolks practised their riding skills in a covered manège adjacent to the amphitheatre, and young gentlemen regularly exercised in a well-equipped gymnasium beneath the stage of the amphitheatre, which became the first venue for a local athletics society.

== Birmingham Athletics Society ==
Some of the young commonfolks who had acted as ushers at the amphitheatre, were invited to join Birmingham Athletics Society as servitorial members, who were free to use the ropes, vaulting horses, and pommel bags, when the gentlemen weren't at them. In exchange, these free members would towel the gentlemen's bodies, 'much in the manner of a stable lad rubbing down a thoroughbred racehorse after a ten-furlong gallop'. The plebeian members also sparred with the young gentlemen.

We used our fore knuckles but pulled the blow as soon as our hands touched our opponent's body ... we always wore mufflers, mittens somewhat larger than fencing gloves and stuffed with wool and oakum, and we always fought with fists half-open, striking with our fingers or fore-knuckles, or with our palms.

Rail describes the Birmingham Athletic Society as the most egalitarian association in England, 'providing a unique cement of union between Birmingham's patricians and plebeians'.

== Priestley Riots ==
By 1790, a number of Dissenters, of whom Joseph Priestley was the most vocal, began to combine to promote political reform. Some suspected that they were root-and-branch radicals and republicans. In May 1791, Prime Minister William Pitt warned Parliament that Priestley and his furious Dissenters considered Episcopacy to be idolatrous and sinful, and believed it their solemn duty at all times to labour the demolition not only of the Church Establishment, but of the English Civil Establishment in King and Parliament. Various Anglican clergymen and Tory gentlemen started to conspire to devise riots that would drive Joseph Priestley and other suspected radical republicans out of Birmingham, and out of England. It was essential that matters did not get out of hand. It seems that the plebeian members of Birmingham Athletics Society, including Billy Hands, were commissioned, or at least encouraged, to stay alert, amongst the crowds, so as to ensure that none of Priestley's Presbyterian friends were injured in their person. There are several contemporary accounts of 'famous boxers' being at the head of the various mobs and restraining any hot-heads amongst the crowds. This strategy proved successful, for no Presbyterians were injured during the four days of rioting. In addition, several of the plebeian athletes, including Hands himself were involved helping to salvage and preserve the Presbyterians' books and furniture, noticeably at Dr. Priestley's Fairhill House and John Ryland's Baskerville House. However, once the Presbyterians had safely escaped, Hands and his allies also helped with the destruction, particularly at Baskerville House, then occupied by Dr. Priestley's friend John Ryland. After purchasing the house from Baskerville's executors, Ryland had doubled its size by attaching a new wing to the south. Hands arrived here with three friends, between 3 and 4 o'clock on the Friday afternoon. At first, Hands helped in rescuing some furniture, after which he went into the new part of the house, where Hands started knocking out a few window jambs in a ground-floor parlour, prior to knocking out the window lintel, which is a key structural element of any building. At this time, the attic of the old part of the house was in flames. Hands also levered up several of the floorboards, which he carried one by one to an adjacent room, where a bonfire was being built. At about a quarter to five, Friday afternoon, several hundred volunteer constables rushed wildly into John Ryland's gardens, hoping to drive off the rioters. Instead, the constables found themselves battered by their own batons. Hands ran into the garden and joined the rioters who were throwing stones and brickbats after the fleeing constables. Thomas Ashwin, one of the constables, collapsed in the street and died. Hands believed that Ashwin had been killed by the stone he had thrown,

== Conviction ==
Two of Hands's workmates informed on him; at that time, Hands was working for Henry Dixon, axletree maker of Digbeth. Hands stood trial before Richard Perryn, at the Courthouse in Warwick on the evening of 24 August. Hands's defence barrister, paid for by some gentlemen in Birmingham, managed to get one of the two prosecution witnesses, to admit that he had quarrelled with Hands. Hands did not call any witness to speak on his behalf; it seems that he continued to feel guilty for the death of Thomas Ashwin. Hands was sentenced to be hanged in public on 8 September.

== Petition for a Royal Pardon ==
Senior clergymen and gentlemen of Birmingham produced a petition for a Royal Pardon which was signed by William Villers, High Bailiff, Charles Curtis, Rector of St Martins, Spencer Madan, Rector of St Philips, and many others. The petition stated that Hands, along with others unconnected with the mob, were pulling up floorboards in order to release men who were trapped in the cellars beneath, and who were in immediate danger of suffocating, the house being on fire. The problem is that the floorboards that Hands was lifting, between four o'clock and half past four that afternoon, were in the new wing of the house, which had no cellar, only a foot-deep ventilation space under the floorboards. There were men in the wine cellar beneath the old wing, but they were in no immediate danger from the fire in the attic. It was not until after six o'clock, when the roof in the old wing fell in, that a dozen men were killed or trapped. Judge Richard Perryn ridiculed Hands's petition, considering it absurd to believe that Hand's defence barristers could have argued his case in court for an hour without once mentioning that men were trapped beneath the floorboards. However, if were true, the Judge conceded that Hands should be reprieved. The Home Secretary, Henry Dundas, decided to send Nicholas Bond, the principal Bow Street investigating magistrate, to meet with the two Birmingham magistrates. When Nicholas Bond arrived, he was confronted with two dozen Birmingham gentlemen, and near a dozen new affidavits in Hands's defence. Billy Hands was pardoned as soon as Bond returned to London. In May 1792, Samuel Whitbread Jr M.P. demanded that Parliament debate the causes of the riots in Birmingham. Whitbread criticised the behaviour of Birmingham's magistrates, and was scathing about Billy Hands's Royal Pardon, which was "based upon spurious evidence that had been contrived, and founded upon testimony and depositions that had been obtained in an extrajudicial way." Whitbread perceptively compared Billy Hands's case with the Balf-Mcquire Affair (1768).

== Aftermath ==
Following his reprieve, Hands was dispatched directly to London, where the Birmingham Rector's brother, ship's biscuit baker William Curtis is said to have found him lodgings in Whitechapel, and employment with a brass-worker in the Minories. Hands married in 1797. When his employer became bankrupt, Hands found a new career as a Clothpacker, for which he served a seven-year mature apprenticeship. Hands and his wife retired to Lambe's almshouses adjacent to the old city wall, in Monkwell Street Cripplegate. Hands died 27 November 1853.

== Bibliography ==
- Rail, Tony. Sentenced to Hang; Memoirs of Billy Hands, 1768–1853). Sudbury, William Tabb (2026).
- Rose, R.B. "The Priestley Riots of 1791." Past and Present 18 (1960): 68–88.
