= John Taylor (manufacturer) =

English manufacturer and banker (1711–1775)

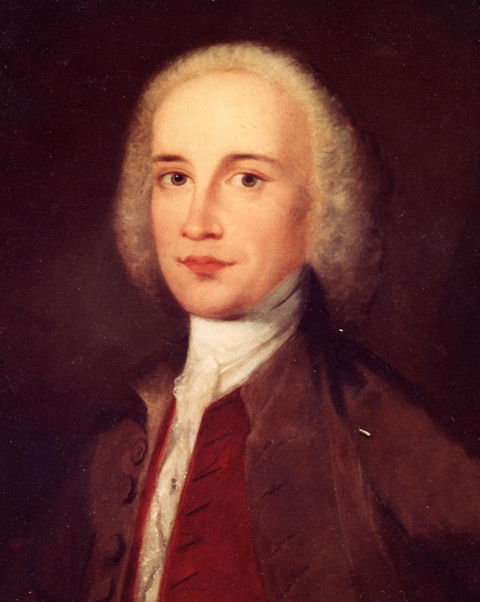
- Portrait by unknown artist
- Born: 1711
- Died: 1775 (aged 63–64)
- Occupations: Manufacturer, banker, High Sheriff of Warwickshire

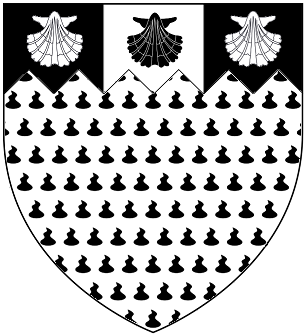
Arms of Taylor: Argent guttée-de-poix, on a chief indented sable a pale between two escallops of the first charged with an escallop of the second

John Taylor (1711–1775) of Bordesley Hall near Birmingham (then a small town in Warwickshire), was an English manufacturer and banker. He served as High Sheriff of Warwickshire in 1756–57.

== Origins ==
John Taylor was the eldest son and heir of Jonathan Taylor (died 1733) of Bordesley by his wife Rebecca Kettle.

== Career ==
Taylor became a cabinet maker in Birmingham. There he set up a factory in what is now Union Street to manufacturer "Brummagem toys", such as buttons, buckles, snuff boxes and jewellery boxes. He made a fortune selling silver-plated articles, and he used the plating process devised by Thomas Boulsover. He eventually employed 500 people and became one of Birmingham's leading industrialists. The output of buttons from his works was estimated at £800 per week. Taylor invested the profits of his business in local land and property, buying Sheldon Hall in 1752 and Moseley Hall and the manor of Yardley in 1768, and eventually owned about 2,000 acres. In 1765, in partnership with his neighbour, the Quaker iron merchant Sampson Lloyd II (1699–1779) (who in 1742 purchased as his country residence the estate of "Farm" within the manor of Bordesley), Taylor founded Taylor and Lloyd's Bank in Dale End, Birmingham, which eventually grew into Lloyds Banking Group, one of the largest banks in the United Kingdom.

== Marriage and children ==
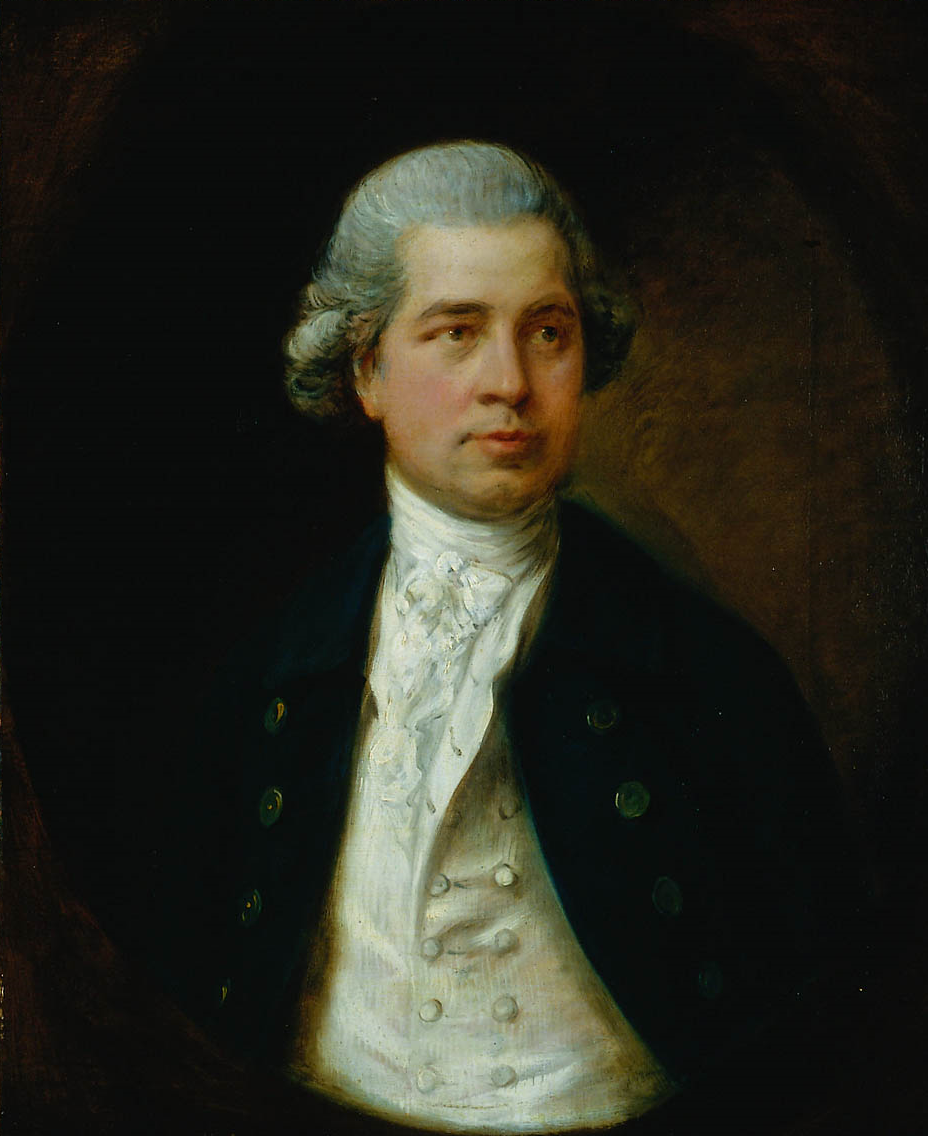
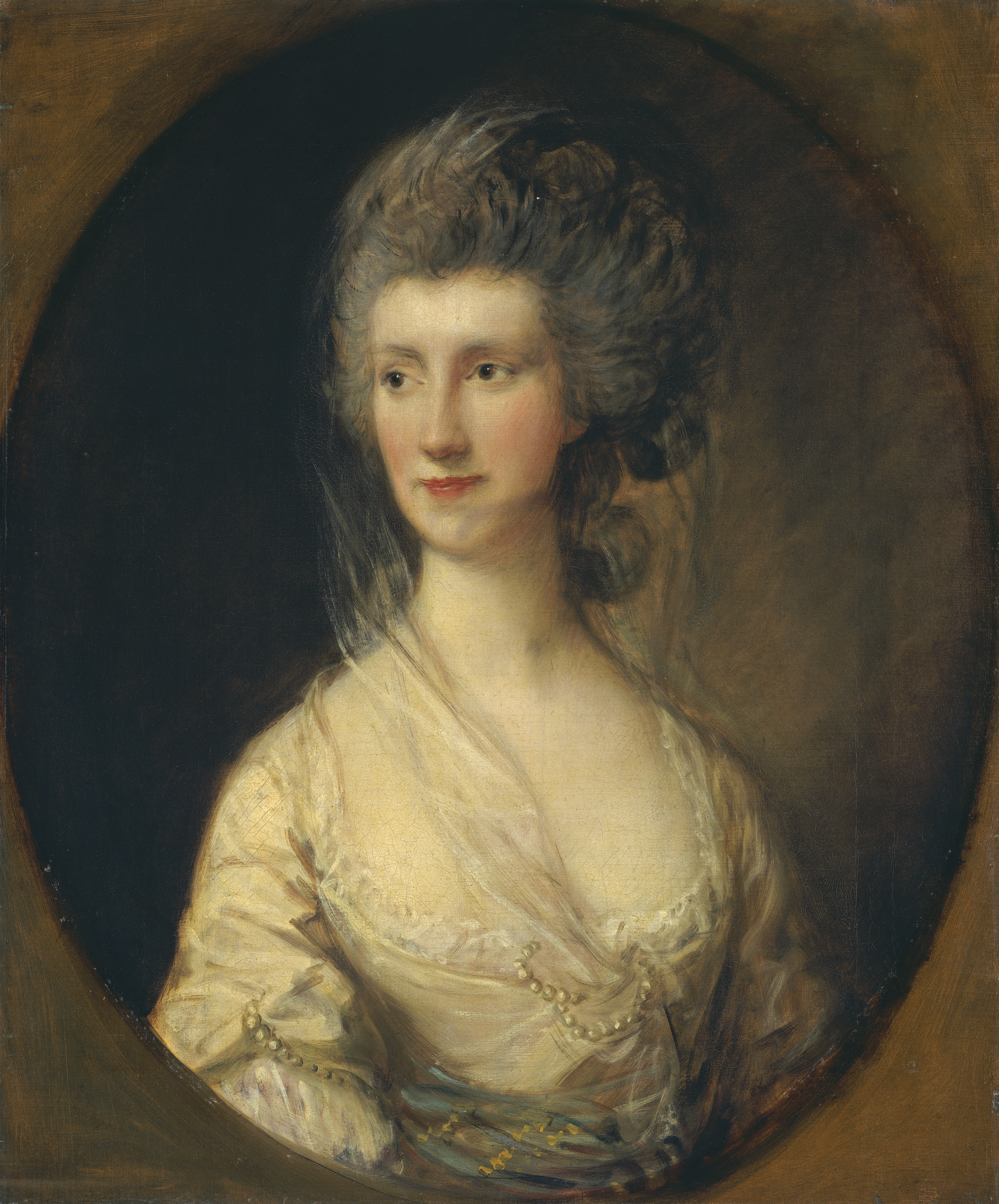
1788 pair of portraits by Thomas Gainsborough of John Taylor (1738–1814), and his wife Sarah Skey "Mrs John Taylor"

In 1734 Taylor married Mary Baker, by whom he had children including John Taylor (1738–1814), his eldest surviving son, of Bordesley Park, Warwickshire and Moseley Hall, Worcestershire, who became a Justice of the Peace, Deputy Lieutenant, and High Sheriff of Warwickshire in 1786. In 1778 he married Sarah Skey, the eldest daughter of Samuel Skey of Spring Grove, Worcestershire. His 1788 portrait by Thomas Gainsborough is in the Museum of Fine Arts, Boston. and a companion portrait by Gainsborough of his wife Sarah is in the National Gallery of Art in Washington. They had three sons, John (born 1780), James (1783–1852) and William (1789–1839).

== Death and legacy ==
Taylor died in 1775 and was buried in a vault in St Philip's Parish Church, Birmingham, built in 1711 on land donated in 1710 by Robert Philip. James Watt commented that at his death Taylor was worth some £200,000. He was succeeded by his son John Taylor (1738–1814), who rebuilt Moseley Hall. Both Bordesley Hall and Moseley Hall were later burnt down by mobs during the Priestley riots of 1791 but were subsequently rebuilt.
