= Bordesley Hall, Birmingham =

Bordesley Hall
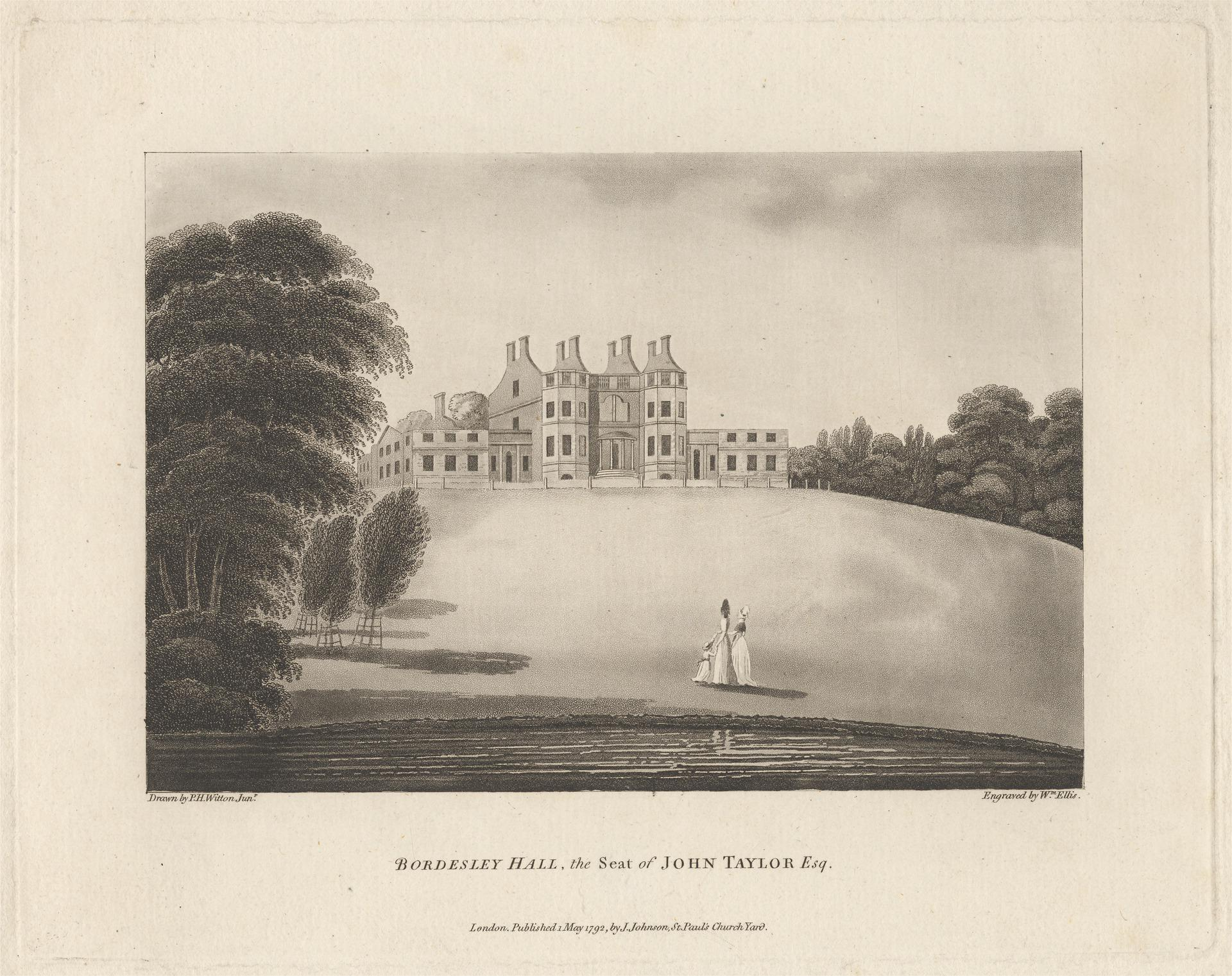
- The ruin of Bordesley Hall by Philip Henry Witton Jr. in 1792 following the Priestley Riots.

- Location within West Midlands county
- Former names: Bordesley Manor

General information
- Type: Manor House
- Architectural style: Medieval, Georgian
- Location: Bordesley, Warwickshire, England
- Coordinates: 52°28′19.2″N 1°52′15.6″W
- Destroyed: 1791
- Demolished: 1840

Bordesley Hall was an 18th-century manor house near Bordesley, Birmingham, which stood in a 15 hectare (40 acre) park south of the Coventry Road in an area between what is now Small Heath and Sparkbrook. The Georgian house was the successor to an earlier medieval moated manor.

== Etymology ==
Arising as early as the 7th century, the ancient manor of Bordesley was recorded as Bordesleie or Bordeslea in 1175, an amalgamation of the Old English words Bord and leā, meaning 'Bord's clearing'. Early records refer interchangeably to variants of Bordeslea and neighbouring Bordeshale or 'Bord's heath' now Balsall Heath. Although now separate districts, the two appear to have originally been one and the same, with the names of both sharing a common origin, likely an Anglian personal name.

== History ==
From around 850 until the mid-1500s, the manor was home to the Grindlay family, who built the original moated manor house and accompanying outbuildings. Although after the conquest of 1066 the manor came under Norman overlordship, the family remained as vassals of the Picquigny, Paganell and then Somery families, the feudal barons of Dudley.

In 1338 the overlordship of the manor passed to the Botetourt family, until in 1370 when Sir John Botetourt settled it on Sir Hugh Segrave and his wife Isabel, who later married Sir Thomas Blount upon his death. In 1390 a settlement between Sir Thomas and Sir Hugh Burnell joined the manors of Bordesley and Haybarn, henceforward linking them together. Thereafter the manor passed through the same ownership and divisions as the overlordship of the other manors in Aston parish.

The Arden family held the manor from 1563 to 1643 until Robert Arden died without issue, leaving his four sisters as coheirs, namely Elizabeth, wife of Sir William Poley of Boxstead Hall, Godith, wife of Herbert Price, Dorothy, wife of Hervey Bagot of Pype Hayes Hall, and Anne, wife of Sir Charles Adderley of Lea. In 1706, the quarter conveyed to Elizabeth was purchased by Sir Charles Holte, 3rd Baronet, after which the manor descended with the Holte family along with that of Aston.

By the 18th century the manor was in the possession of John Taylor, the Warwickshire manufacturer and banker, who rebuilt the house, enlarged and emparked the estate and created an ornamental pool with an island, bridge, and grotto at a cost of around £10,000. On his death in 1785, the property passed to his son John and his wife Sarah Skeye, whose seven children were all born at the hall. In 1786, John Taylor Jr. was appointed High Sheriff of Warwickshire like his father before him.

The house was burned down in 1791 during the Priestley Riots. Taylor claimed £12,670 as damages and was paid £9,902, but the historian William Hutton recorded that "the real loss of Mr Taylor amounted to upwards £22,600," or approximately £3 million today (2022).

“Hearing Mr. Taylor's house was in danger, they marched to Bordesley, one mile, to save it, but found another mob had begun to rob and burn it. At midnight I could see from my house the flames of Bordesley hall rise with dreadful aspect" – William Hutton, A Narrative Of The Riots In Birmingham, 14 July 1791

The house was reportedly rebuild, but Charles Pye Sr. writing of his visit to Birmingham in 1818 states:

"Having crossed the Warwick canal, the ruins of Bordesley house are in full view; they having continued in that state ever since the year 1791, when the house was demolished by an infuriated mob. The land by which it is surrounded has been parcelled out, and advertised to be let for building."– Charles Pye, 1820

In 1840 the remaining house and lands were sold off for housing developments.

== Location ==
The exact former location of the house is somewhat unclear; however, the first series Ordnance Survey map places the hall in the area of Albert and Bolton Roads, this location being supported by the image of the ruins drawn in 1791 by Philip Henry Witton Jr., the clerk and draughtsman, which places it on an elevated site.

Although the precise position of Bordesley Hall remains uncertain, the estate at large can be seen on various maps and surveys of the area prior to its demolition in 1840.

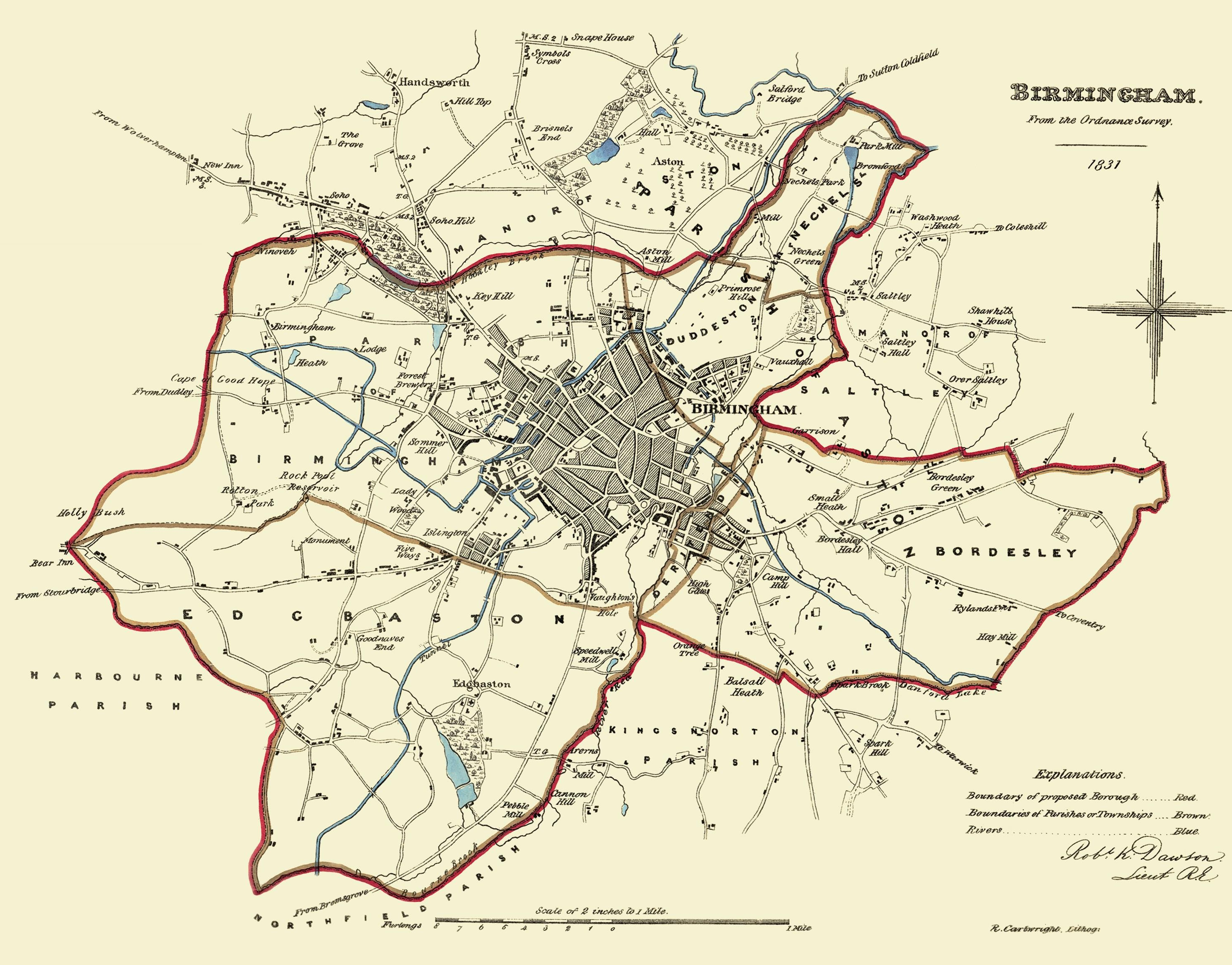
Bordesley Hall on the map of the proposed Parliamentary Borough of Birmingham, surveyed in 1831 for the Great Reform Act by Robert K. Dawson.

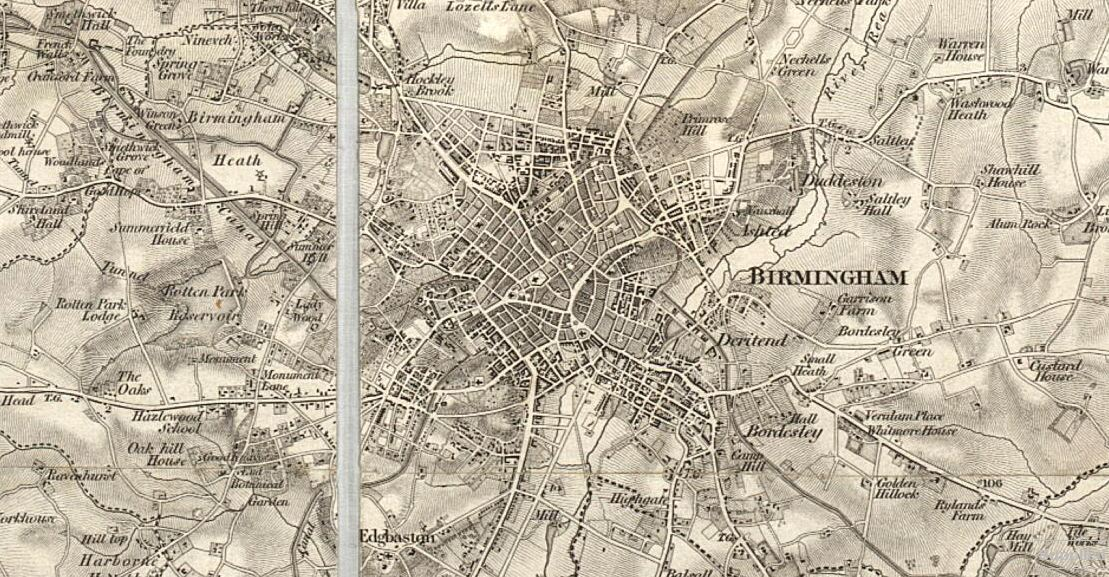
Bordesley Hall and its surrounding parkland on the 1834 Ordnance Survey map of Birmingham.
