= John Pye =

British landscape engraver (1782–1874)

John Pye (Birmingham 7 November 1782 – 6 February 1874 London) was a British landscape engraver.

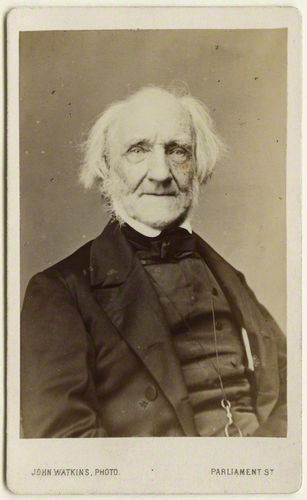
John Pye, photograph from the 1860s by John Watkins.

== Life ==
He was the second son of Charles Pye of Birmingham, where he was born on 7 November 1782; his mother was a daughter of John Radclyffe, also of Birmingham, and aunt of William Radclyffe the engraver. His brother Charles Pye was also an engraver. His father published an account of Birmingham, a geographical dictionary, and several series of plates of provincial coins and tokens. These engraved by himself, with the assistance of his son John, who was removed from school when still a child, and received his first instruction in engraving from his father. Later he was a pupil of Joseph Barber of Birmingham, and was then apprenticed to a plate-engraver named Tolley.

In 1801 John Pye went to London with his cousin, William Radclyffe, and became a paid assistant of James Heath, to whom his elder brother was articled. He was employed on works of natural history and in engraving the backgrounds of book illustrations.

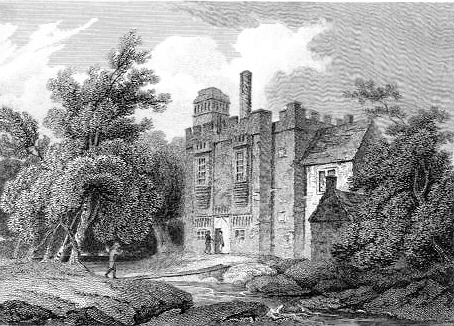
Rye House, Hertfordshire, engraving by Pye, after J. C. Smith.

Pye made a career of illustrations to popular annuals and pocket-books. In 1830, at the request of John Sheepshanks, he undertook the publication of a series of engravings from pictures in the National Gallery during the 1830s. He retired in 1858.

Pye was among the founders of the Artists' Annuity Fund, with his friend William Mulready. He spent much of his time in France, where, in 1862, he was elected a corresponding member of the Académie des Beaux-Arts; he had already, in 1846, received a gold medal from the French government, and he was also an honorary member of the St. Petersburg Academy of Arts. But he never sought or received honours from the Royal Academy, to which he was hostile because of its refusal to recognise engravers as the equals of painters and sculptors; he appeared before a select committee of the House of Commons appointed to inquire into the subject in 1836.

Pye died at his residence, 17 Gloucester Terrace, Regent's Park, on 6 February 1874.

== Works ==
In 1805 Pye was entrusted by Heath with the execution of a plate of Inveraray Castle from a drawing by J. M. W. Turner. In 1810 John Britton, who was then publishing his work, The Fine Arts of the English School, commissioned Pye to engrave for it Turner's picture, Pope's Villa at Twickenham. Pye's plates after Turner include:

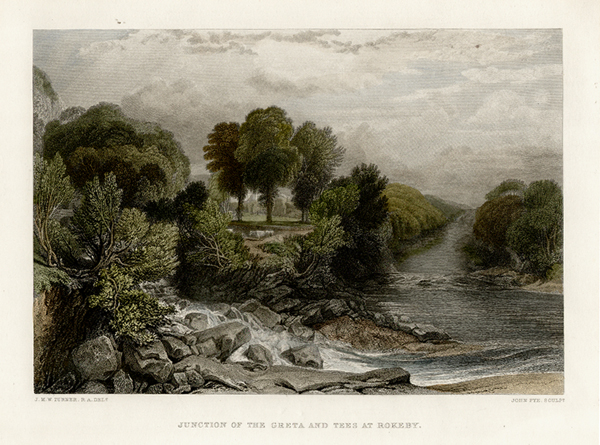
The Junction of the Greta and Tees at Rokeby (1823), after Turner; hand-coloured.

- High Street, Oxford (figures by Charles Theodosius Heath), 1812;
- View of Oxford from the Abingdon Road (figures by C. Heath), 1818;
- The Rialto, Venice, La Riccia, and Lake of Nemi (for James Hakewill's Tour in Italy, 1818);
- Junction of the Greta and Tees, Wycliffe, near Rokeby, and Hardraw Fall (for Thomas Dunham Whitaker's Richmondshire, 1823);
- Temple of Jupiter in the Island of Ægina, 1827;
- Tivoli and Pæstum (for Samuel Rogers's Italy, 1830); and
- Ehrenbreitstein, 1845.

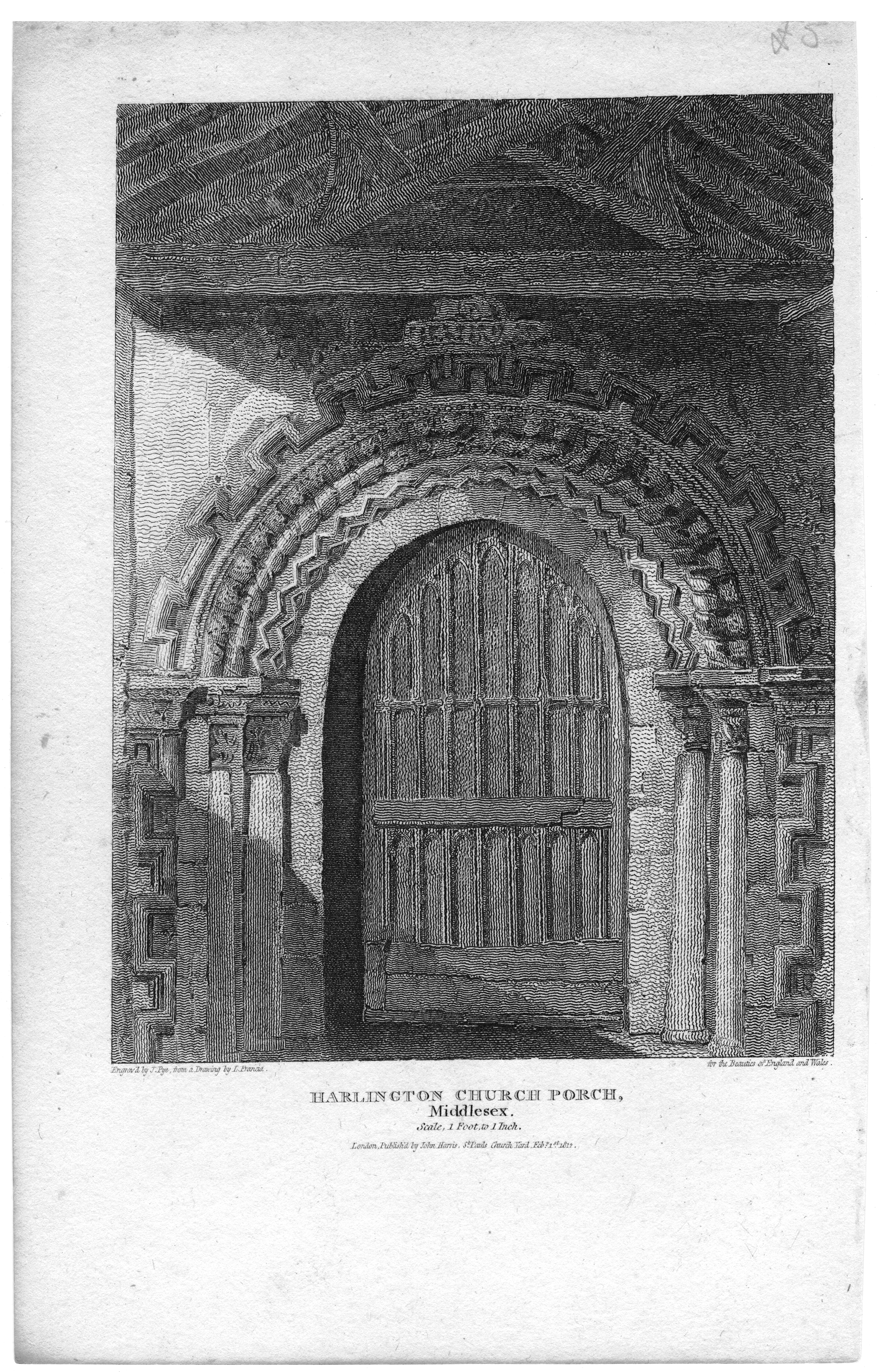
Porch of Harlington, Middlesex, engraved by John Pye, drawn by L. Francia, for the Beauties of England and Wales, 1812, published by John Harris, London.

Among his other large plates are Cliefden on the Thames, after John Glover, 1816; All that remains of the Glory of William Smith, after Edwin Landseer, 1836; Light Breeze off Dover, after Augustus Wall Callcott, 1839; and Temple of the Sun, Baalbec, after David Roberts, 1849.

Of his illustrations, Ehrenbreitstein after Turner (in the Literary Souvenir, 1828), and The Sunset after George Barret (in the Amulet), are representative. He engraved the entire series of headpieces from drawings by William Havell, Samuel Prout, George Cuitt, and others, which appeared in the Royal Repository, or Picturesque Pocket Diary, 1817–39; Le Souvenir, or Pocket Tablet, 1822–43; and Peacock's Polite Repository, 1813–58.

In 1845 Pye published Patronage of British Art, an acrimonious assault on the Royal Academy demanding reform; and in 1851 he renewed the attack in a pamphlet entitled A Glance at the Rise and Constitution of the Royal Academy of London; some of the changes he advocated he lived to see carried out.

Pye formed a collection of impressions of Turner's Liber Studiorum, which went to the print-room of the British Museum; his notes on the subject, edited by John Lewis Roget, were published in 1879.

== Family ==
Pye married, in 1808, Mary, daughter of Samuel Middiman the landscape engraver (by whom he was assisted in the preliminary stages of some of his plates); and they had an only child Mary, who survived him.
