= Robert K. Dawson (surveyor) =

English military engineer, surveyor and cartographer (1798–1861)

Robert Kearsley Dawson CB
- Born: 1798; Dover, England
- Died: 28 March 1861 (aged 62–63); Lee Grove, Blackheath, London
- Relatives: Robert Dawson (father)
- Military career
- Allegiance: United Kingdom
- Branch: Board of Ordnance
- Years of service: 1816–1853
- Rank: Colonel
- Service number: 548
- Unit: Corps of Royal Engineers
- Awards: Companion of the Order of the Bath

Colonel Robert Kearsley Dawson CB (1798 – 1861) was an English surveyor and cartographer of the Corps of Royal Engineers.

== Early life ==
Robert K. Dawson was born in 1798 in Dover. His father was Robert Dawson, a surveyor. He studied at the Royal Military Academy, Woolwich.

== Career ==
Dawson was commissioned in the Corps of Royal Engineers as 2nd Lieutenant on 1 March 1816, and between 1819 and 1829 took part in the triangulation and mapping of Ireland and Scotland under Thomas Colby.

In 1831, he was recalled to England to survey the boundaries of the proposed Parliamentary Boroughs for the Great Reform Act, producing a series of one-inch and two-inch maps that are preserved in two volumes in the British Library.

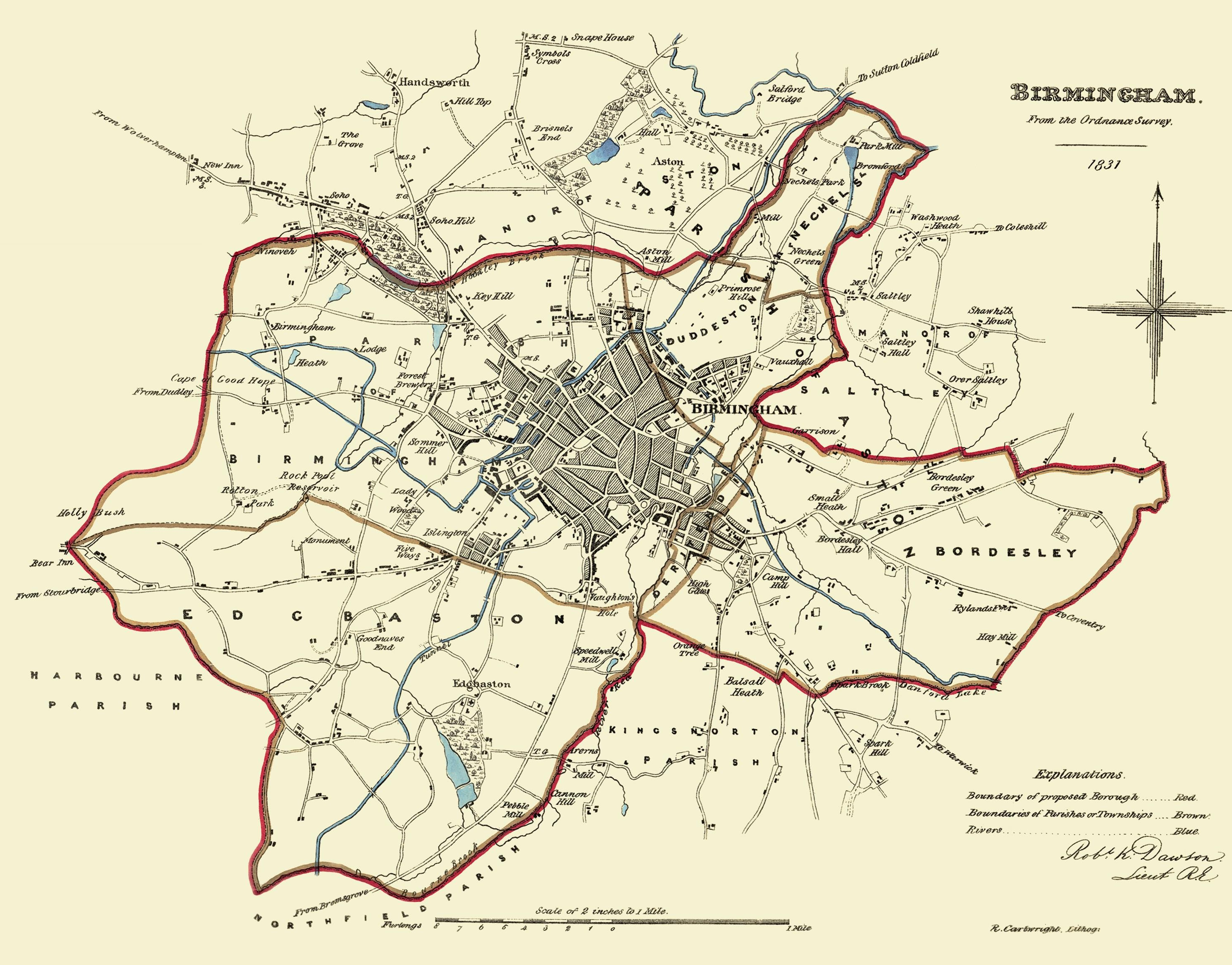
The proposed Parliamentary Borough of Birmingham, surveyed by Dawson in 1831 for the Great Reform Act

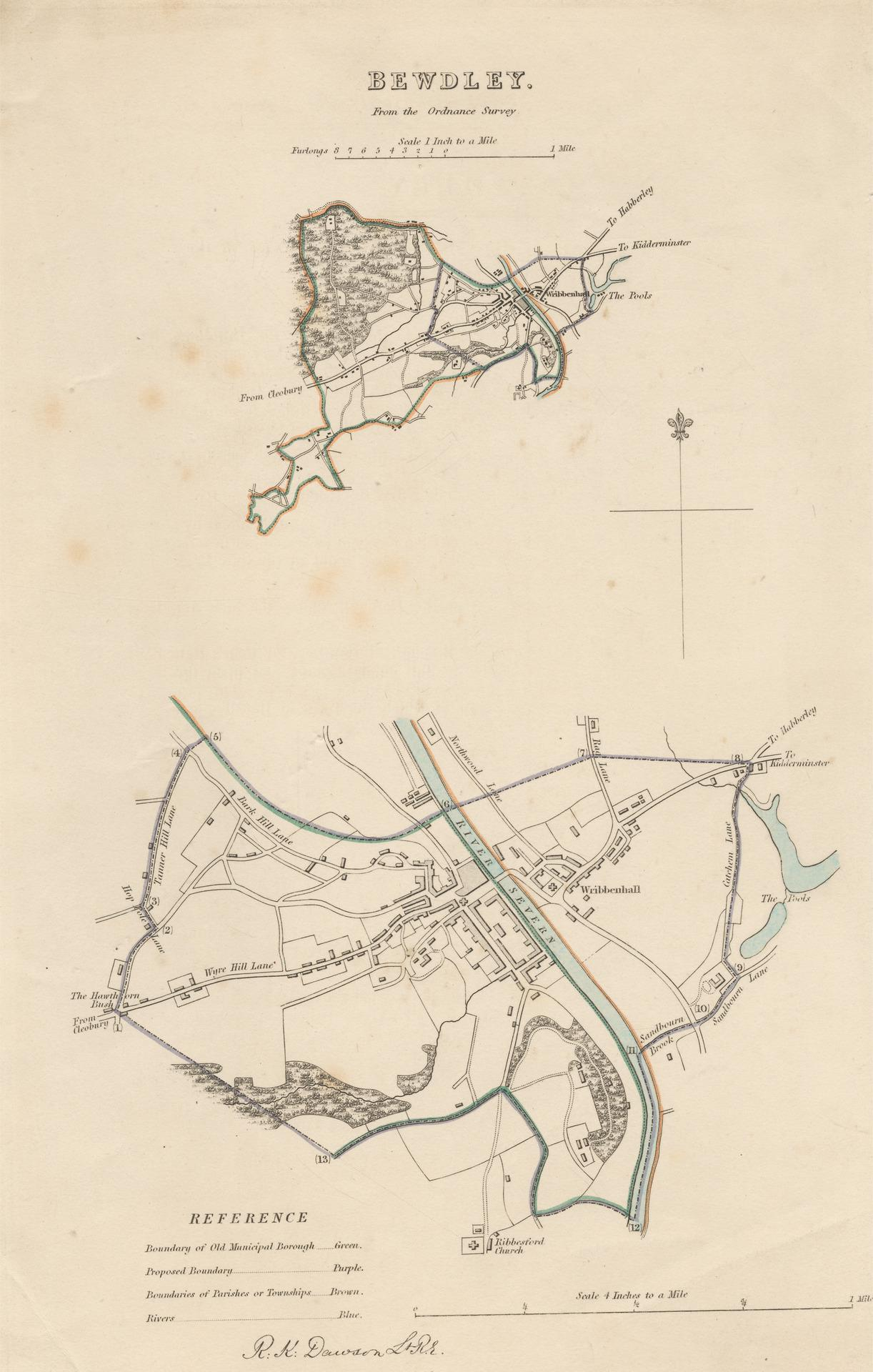
Bewdley from the Ordnance Survey

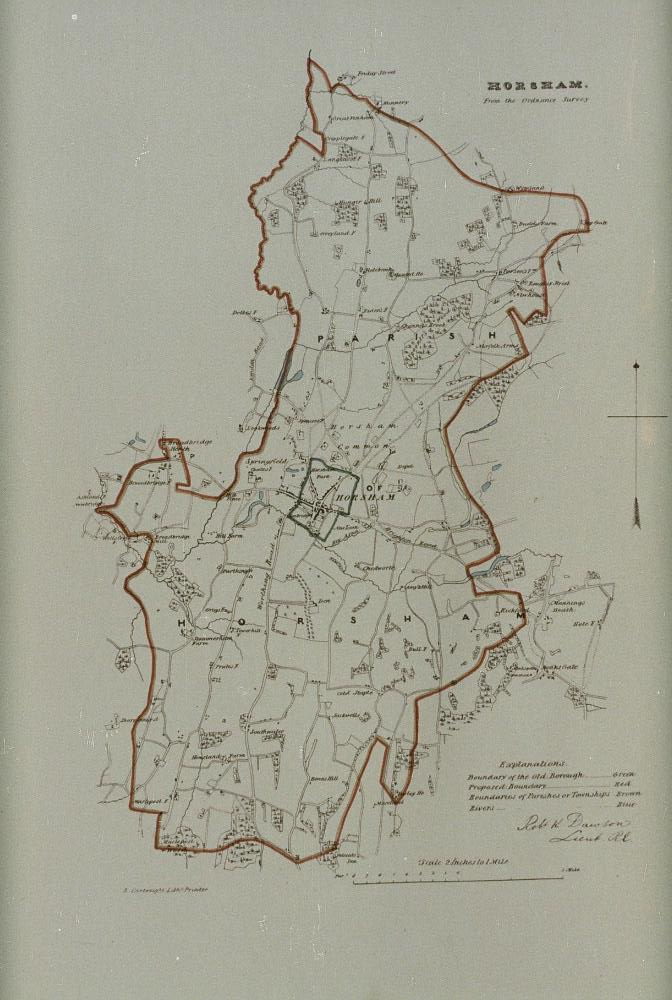
Horsham from the Ordnance Survey

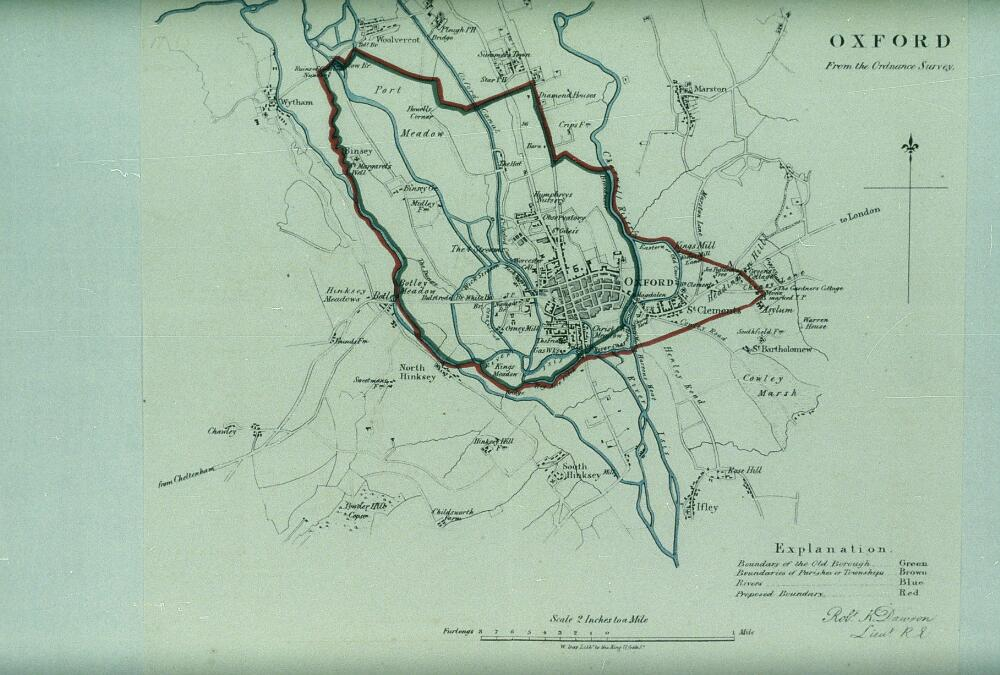
Oxford from the Ordnance Survey

== Death ==
He died at Lee Grove, Blackheath, London, on 28 March 1861.

== See also ==
- Unknown (1862). "Minutes of the Proceedings of the Institution of Civil Engineers: Obituary. Colonel Robert Kearsley Dawson, C.B., R.E., 1798-1861". Minutes of the Proceedings of the Institution of Civil Engineers. 21 (1862): 582–584. doi:10.1680/imotp.1862.23428.
- Andrews, John Harwood (1975). A Paper Landscape: The Ordnance Survey in the Nineteenth Century. Clarendon Press.
