= John Ash (physician) =

English physician (1723–1798)

John Ash FRS
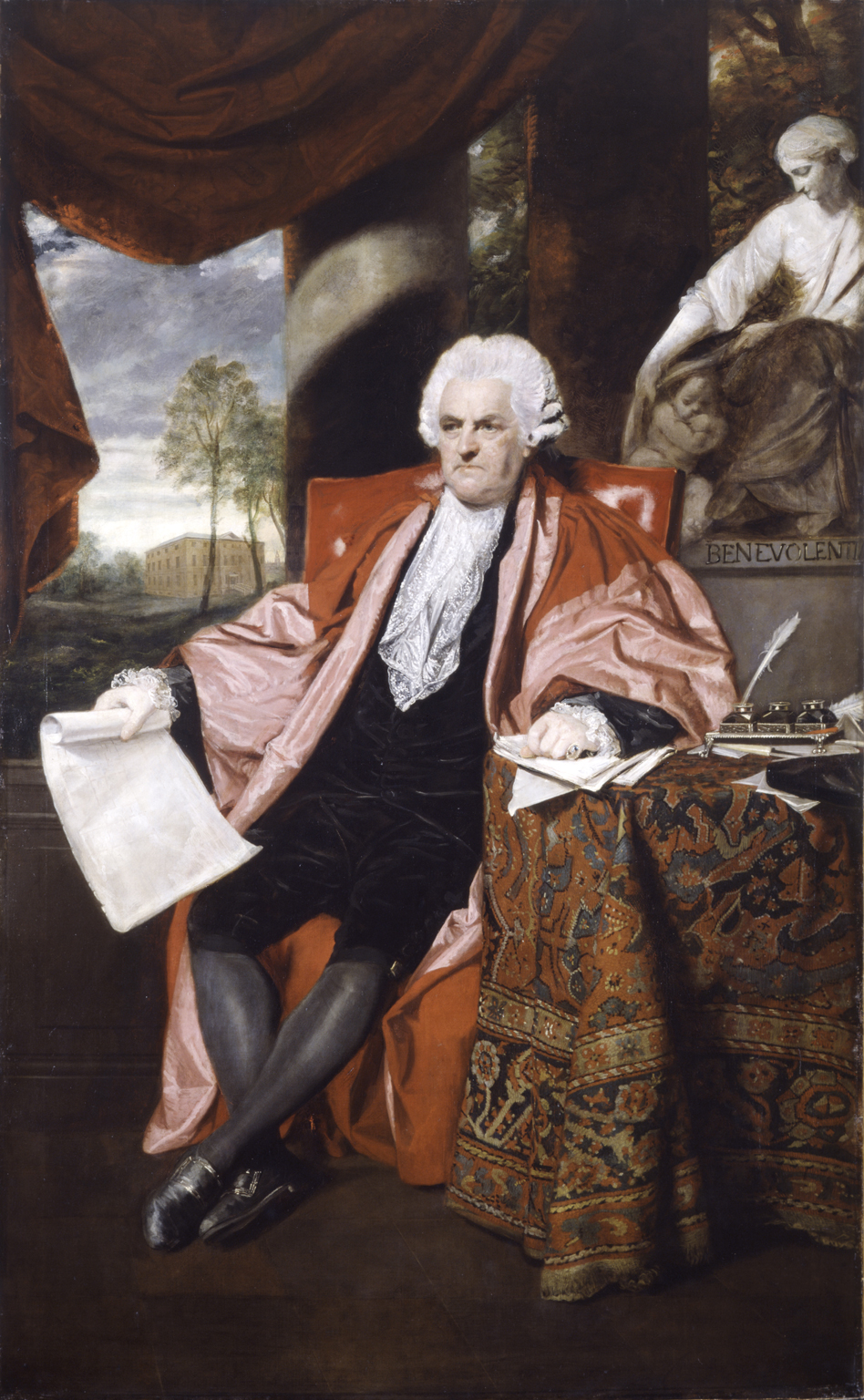
- John Ash by Joshua Reynolds (1788)
- Born: 1723; Coventry, England
- Died: 18 June 1798 (aged 74–75)
- Resting place: Kensington Church, London
- Education: Trinity College, Oxford
- Occupation: Physician
- Known for: Founding Birmingham General Hospital

John Ash (1723 – 18 June 1798), was an English physician and founder of Birmingham General Hospital.

== Biography ==
Ash was born in Coventry, Warwickshire, the son of a brewer, and was educated at Trinity College, Oxford; was B.A. in 1743, M.A. in 1746, M.B. in 1750, and M.D. in 1754. He settled at Birmingham, and soon acquired a large practice. Birmingham General Hospital was founded chiefly through his influence, and he was its first physician. While actively engaged in practice he became affected with temporary mental derangement, for which it is said he found a cure in the study of mathematics and botany. He was admitted a candidate of the Royal College of Physicians on 22 December 1786, and in the following year resigned his office in Birmingham and removed to London. He became fellow of the College of Physicians on 22 December 1787, and afterwards practised with success in London. He filled the offices of censor of the college in 1789 and 1793; was Harveian orator in 1790, Gulstonian lecturer in 1791, and Croonian lecturer in 1793. He died on 18 June 1798, and was buried in Kensington Church (since rebuilt). His portrait, by Sir Joshua Reynolds, once in the hospital at Birmingham, was acquired by Birmingham Museum and Art Gallery in 2012. It was engraved by Bartolozzi in 1791. In the picture, above his right elbow is the foundation block of the then medical school, on Holloway Head. This became part of the Accident Hospital, since redeveloped as apartments.

== Works ==
Ash was a Fellow of the Royal Society, described as a physician of great skill, and of considerable other attainments. He founded the social and literary Eumelian Club. The name was a punning allusion to the ash tree (Greek έυμελίας or έῦμμελίης, i.e. with an ashen spear). It was referred to in James Boswell's Life of Johnson, in a note to the last chapter. He wrote:

- Experiments and Observations to investigate by Chemical Analysis the properties of the Mineral Waters of Spa, Aix, London, 1788.
- Oratio Harveiana, 1790.

== Legacy ==
Commemorative plaque to Dr John Ash on Temple Row, Birmingham.

The Birmingham suburb of Ashted is named after Ash. He is also commemorated by a blue plaque, affixed to the former House of Fraser store in Temple Row, Birmingham.
