= St James the Less' Church, Ashted =

- St James the Less’ Church, Ashted
- St James the Less' Church, Ashted
- 52°29′8″N 1°52′42.5″W
- OS grid reference: SP 08251 87563
- Location: Birmingham
- Country: England
- Denomination: Church of England

History
- Dedication: St James the Less
- Consecrated: 1810

Architecture
- Completed: 9 October 1791
- Demolished: 1956

Specifications
- Length: 92 feet (28 m)
- Width: 56 feet (17 m)

St James the Less’ Church, Ashted was a former Church of England parish church in Ashted, Birmingham.

== History ==
The church was originally the family home of Dr. Ash which he had built in 1780. This house was 56 ft by 56 ft. It was converted into chapel of ease to Aston Parish Church on 9 October 1791 and known as Ashted Chapel. In 1809, it was purchased by George Simcox and J.L. Green for £1,200, and they spent a further £1,500 rebuilding it. It was consecrated in 1810. The church contained a Nave and Chancel, choir vestry, clergy vestry, western vestibule, north west porch, south west porch and a western semi-circular baptistry. The circular cupola-tower contained a set of eight of Harrington's tubular bells.

In 1853 land was taken from Aston Parish Church to form a parish.

It was repaired in 1829 when a new vicar, Revd. Josiah Allport, was appointed and arrived to find it closed and without a roof. under the supervision of Thomas Rickman and Henry Hutchinson for a cost of £860. It was repaired again in 1887 - 1888 when again the roof was found to be liable to fall in. The interior was re-arranged, and a portion of the east end was rebuilt. The western vestibule was formed, and the organ was removed from the western gallery. This work cost around £2,500.

The church was damaged in an air raid during the Second World War and demolished in 1956.

== Incumbents ==
- Revd. Josiah Allport 1829 - 1859

== Organ ==
An organ by Banfield was installed. A specification of the organ can be found on the National Pipe Organ Register.
