= Charles Pye (engraver) =

British engraver

Charles Pye Jr. (Birmingham 1777–1864) was a British engraver from Birmingham. He illustrated topographical subjects, and published a Holy Family after Michelangelo.

== Life ==
Pye was the elder son of Charles Pye Sr. (see below), an engraver in Birmingham, and the brother of landscape engraver John Pye. He was a pupil of James Heath.

During his later years, Pye lived in Leamington. A trade card (proof before engraved letters) is in the Heal Collection (Heal, 59.124) and advertises "C. Pye Engraver, No.14 Charton St. Sommerstown."

== Works ==
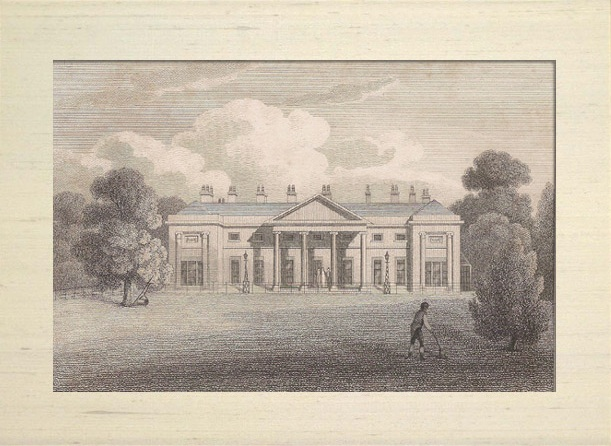
Charles Pye, 1814 engraving of Castle Hill Lodge, Ealing

Pye's engravings were published in collections including:

- Beauties of England Illustrated
- Hunter's History of London
- Cadell & Davies, Britannia depicta.
- J. Scott and P. B. de la Boissière, Picturesque Views of the City of Paris and its Environs (1823)

Pye supplied engravings to designs by William Westall for the early issues of John Poole's The Regent, Or, Royal Tablet of Memory. In 1820 he published a letter, from Euston Square, on his experiments with relief etching on copper, in The London Journal of Arts and Sciences.

== Charles Pye senior ==
In numismatics, the elder Charles Pye was associated with the Soho Mint. He worked with Sarah Sophia Banks to issue a catalogue of tokens, illustrated by his own engravings, for collectors. He published A Correct and Complete Representation of all the Provincial Copper Coins, Tokens of Trade, and Cards of Address, on Copper, Which were circulated as such between the Years 1787 and 1801 (1801). A third edition of this book was edited by Arthur William Waters, and appeared in 1916 as a limited edition.

Pye also published Birmingham directories, and A Description of Modern Birmingham (c.1819).
