= Priestley Riots =

1791 religious riots in Birmingham, England

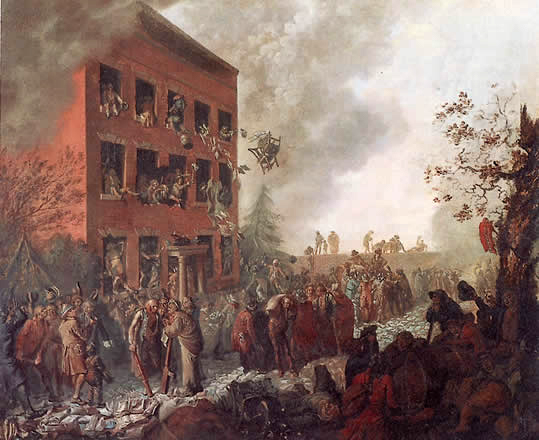
The attack on Joseph Priestley's home, Fairhill, at Sparkbrook, Birmingham, on 14 July 1791

The Priestley Riots (also known as the Birmingham Riots of 1791) took place from 14 July to 17 July 1791 in Birmingham, Warwickshire, England; the rioters' main targets were religious dissenters, most notably the politically and theologically controversial Joseph Priestley. Both local and national issues stirred the passions of the rioters, from disagreements over public library book purchases, controversies over Dissenters' attempts to gain full civil rights and their support of the French Revolution.

The riots started with an attack on the Royal Hotel, Birmingham—the site of a banquet organised to publicise the diners’ support for the French Revolutionaries, in order to enhance Anglo-French trade. Then, beginning with Priestley's church and home, the rioters attacked or burned four Dissenting chapels, twenty-seven houses, and several businesses. Many of them became intoxicated by liquor that they found while looting, or with which they were bribed to stop burning homes. A small core, including some men whom the crowd knew to be local boxers, could not be bribed. It has been suggested that the rioters burned not only the homes and chapels of Dissenters, but also the homes of people they associated with Dissenters, such as members of the scientific Lunar Society. A more recent review of the riots, suggests that Josiah Wedgwood's Etruria Hall was threatened, not for of Wedgwood’s association with the Lunar Society, but because he was an agitator for radical reform. William Withering was not on the ‘List of Names’ targeted for attack, however, on the fourth day of rioting a few seventeen-year-old lads did visit Withering’s Edgbaston Hall, because they knew that Withering and Priestley were friends. The youths went as spectators and opportunists, hoping for some free alcohol and a few coins. They were quickly removed by ten Birmingham boxers who then remained nearby.

While the riots were not initiated by Prime Minister William Pitt's administration, it has been suggested that the national government was slow to respond to the Dissenters' pleas for help. This has been recently disputed. Local officials seem to have been involved in the planning of the riots, and were later reluctant to prosecute ringleaders. Industrialist James Watt wrote that the riots "divided [Birmingham] into two parties who hate one another mortally". Those who had been attacked gradually left, leaving Birmingham a more conservative city than previously.

== Historical context ==
=== Birmingham ===
Over the course of the eighteenth century, Birmingham became notorious for its riots, which were sparked by a number of causes. In 1714 and 1715, the townspeople, as part of a "Church-and-King" mob, attacked Dissenters (Protestants who did not adhere to the Church of England or follow its practices). In the Sacheverell riots during the London trial of Henry Sacheverell, and in 1751 and 1759 Quakers and Methodists were assaulted. During the anti-Catholic Gordon Riots in 1780, large crowds assembled in Birmingham. In 1766, 1782, 1795, and 1800 mobs protested about high food prices. One contemporary described Birmingham rioters as the "bunting, beggarly, brass-making, brazen-faced, brazen-hearted, blackguard, bustling, booby Birmingham mob".

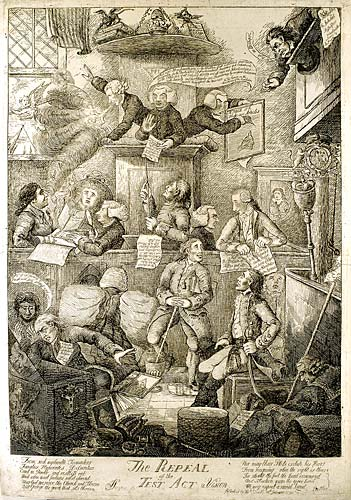
Caricaturist James Sayers's "Repeal of the Test Act: A Vision" shows Priestley spewing the smoke of heresy from the pulpit.

Up until the late 1780s, religious divisions did not affect Birmingham's elite. Dissenter and Anglican lived side by side harmoniously: they were on the same town promotional committees; they pursued joint scientific interests in the Lunar Society; and they worked together in local government. They stood united against what they viewed as the threat posed by unruly plebeians. After the riots, however, scientist and clergyman Joseph Priestley argued in his An Appeal to the Public on the Subject of the Birmingham Riots (1791) that this cooperation had not in fact been as amicable as generally believed. Priestley revealed that disputes over the local library, Sunday Schools, and church attendance had divided Dissenters from Anglicans. In his Narrative of the Riots in Birmingham (1816), stationer and Birmingham historian William Hutton agreed, arguing that five events stoked the fires of religious friction: disagreements over inclusion of Priestley's books in the local public library; concerns over Dissenters' attempts to repeal the Test and Corporation Acts; religious controversy (particularly involving Priestley); an "inflammatory hand-bill"; and a dinner celebrating the outbreak of the French Revolution.

Once Birmingham Dissenters started to agitate for the repeal of the Test and Corporation Acts, which restricted Dissenters' civil rights (preventing them, for instance, from attending the Universities of Oxford or Cambridge, or from holding public office), the semblance of unity among the town's elite disappeared. Unitarians such as Priestley were at the forefront of the repeal campaign, and orthodox Anglicans grew nervous and angry. After 1787, the emergence of Dissenting groups formed for the sole purpose of overturning these laws began to divide the community; however, the repeal efforts failed in 1787, 1789 and 1790. Priestley's support of the repeal and his heterodox religious views, which were widely published, inflamed the populace. In February 1790, a group of activists came together not only to oppose the interests of the Dissenters but also to counteract what they saw as the undesirable importation of French Revolutionary ideals. Dissenters by and large supported the French Revolution and its efforts to question the role monarchy should play in government. . Although this effort failed, the efforts to establish such a society increased tensions in Birmingham.

In summer 1791, Priestley and his friends planned a radical society, the Warwickshire Constitutional Society, to match Constitutional Societies that had been formed in Chester and Manchester which sought electoral reform, providing a more equal representation and shorter Parliaments. It has been suggested that Priestley’s friends intended launching this society at a public dinner in Birmingham on Bastille Day. Priestley even wrote a threepenny pamphlet for the occasion Although these plans by Priestley and his friends had to be abandoned, their activities increased tensions in Birmingham.

In addition to these religious and political differences, both the lower-class rioters and their upper-class Anglican leaders had economic complaints against the middle-class Dissenters. They envied the ever-increasing prosperity of these industrialists as well as the power that came with that economic success. Historian R. B. Rose refers to these industrialists as belonging to "an inner elite of magnates"; while Billy Hands talks of “purse-proud monopolists” and abuses in the system of Division of labour. Priestley himself had written a pamphlet, An Account of a Society for Encouraging the Industrious Poor (1787), on how best to extract the most work for the smallest amount of money from the poor. Its emphasis on debt collection did not endear him to the poverty-stricken.

=== British reaction to the French Revolution ===
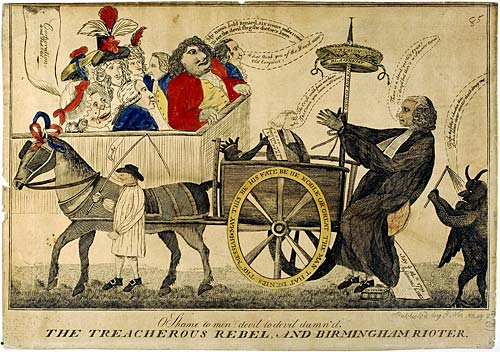
"The Treacherous Rebel and Birmingham Rioter" (c.1791), with Joseph Priestley as the rebel being chased by Satan (at right)

The British public debate over the French Revolution, or the Revolution Controversy, lasted from 1789 through 1795. Initially many on both sides of the Channel thought the French would follow the pattern of the English Glorious Revolution of a century before, and the Revolution was viewed positively by a large portion of the British public. Before and during the Priestley riots, Brummagems went around shouting the French-revolutionaries’ rallying cry, l’ènergie. Most Britons celebrated the storming of the Bastille in 1789, believing that France's absolute monarchy should be replaced by a more democratic form of government. In these heady early days, supporters of the Revolution also believed that Britain's own system would be reformed as well: voting rights would be broadened and redistribution of Parliamentary constituency boundaries would eliminate so-called "rotten boroughs".

After the publication of statesman and philosopher Edmund Burke's Reflections on the Revolution in France (1790), in which he surprisingly broke ranks with his liberal Whig colleagues to support the French aristocracy, a pamphlet war discussing the Revolution began in earnest. Because Burke had supported the American colonists in their rebellion against Great Britain, his views sent a shockwave through the country. While Burke supported aristocracy, monarchy, and the Established Church, liberals such as Charles James Fox supported the Revolution, and a programme of individual liberties, civic virtue and religious toleration, while radicals such as Priestley, William Godwin, Thomas Paine, and Mary Wollstonecraft, argued for a further programme of republicanism, agrarian socialism, and abolition of the "landed interest". Alfred Cobban called the debate that erupted "perhaps the last real discussion of the fundamentals of politics in [Britain]".

== Hints of trouble ==
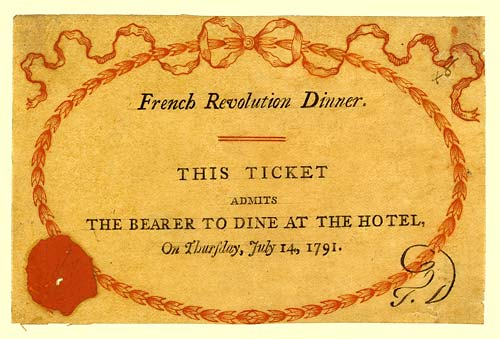
Ticket for the dinner celebrating the second anniversary of the storming of the Bastille on 14 July 1791

On 11 July 1791, a Birmingham newspaper announced that on 14 July, the second anniversary of the storming of the Bastille, there would be a dinner at the local Royal Hotel to commemorate the outbreak of the French Revolution; the invitation encouraged "any Friend to Freedom" to attend:

A number of gentlemen intend dining together on the 14th instant, to commemorate the auspicious day which witnessed the emancipation of twenty-six millions of people from the yoke of despotism, and restored the blessings of equal government to a truly great and enlightened nation; with whom it is our interest, as a commercial people, and our duty, as friends to the general rights of mankind, to promote a free intercourse, as subservient to a permanent friendship.

Any Friend to Freedom, disposed to join the intended temperate festivity, is desired to leave his name at the bar of the Hotel, where tickets may be had at Five Shillings each, including a bottle of wine; but no person will be admitted without one.

Dinner will be on table at three o'clock precisely.

Alongside this notice was a threat: "an authentic list" of the participants would be published after the dinner. On the same day, "an ultra-revolutionary" handbill, written by James Hobson (although his authorship was not known at the time), entered circulation. Town officials offered 100 guineas for information regarding the publication of the handbill and its author, to no avail. The Dissenters found themselves forced to plead ignorance and decry the "radical" ideas promoted by the handbill. It was becoming clear by 12 July that there would be trouble at the dinner. On the morning of 14 July graffiti such as "destruction to the Presbyterians" and "Church and King for ever" were scrawled across the town. At this point, Priestley's friends, fearing for his safety, dissuaded him from attending the dinner.

Rail places a different interpretation on these handbills, pointing out that the implied threat of “an authentic list” of attendees at the “French Revolution Dinner,” had been answered by a “foolish” but harmless handbill written by Rev John Hobson who kept a boys’ boarding school at Balsall Heath. After the riots, a printer’s apprentice gave Hobson’s name to the authorities, though Hobson had already taken his family to Liverpool, and taken a ship to America. However, John Brooke (1755-1802), a local lawyer, deliberately muddled Hobson’s “foolish” handbill with the “ultra-revolutionary handbill.” Brooke convinced the Home Secretary that the four days of rioting had been a spontaneous popular rising against that seditious handbill, the author of which had already fled the country, so central government had no need to investigate the matter.

Rail goes further, calling the “ultra-revolutionary handbill” a “wily ruse”, which had only been printed in a handful of copies, two of which had been sent to the Prime Minister and Home Secretary by two local European merchants. It seems that, if the populace had become agitated by talk of sedition, they were in fact animated by the 100 Guineas reward handbill, which publicized the existence of a “seditious handbill” which hardly anyone had actually seen.

== 14 July ==
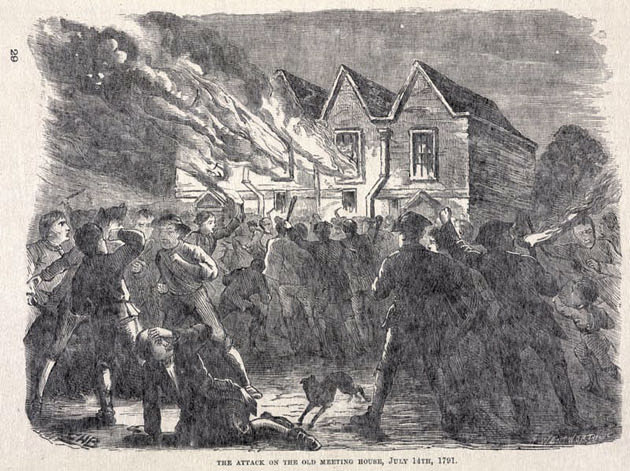
Destruction of Old Meeting chapel (from an 1879 engraving by Robert Dent)

About 90 hardy sympathisers of the French Revolution came to celebrate on 14 July; the banquet was led by James Keir, an Anglican industrialist who was a member of the Lunar Society of Birmingham. When the guests arrived at the hotel at 2 or 3 p.m., they were greeted by 60 or 70 protesters who temporarily dispersed while yelling, rather bizarrely and confusingly, "no popery". By the time the celebrants ended their dinner, around 7 or 8 p.m., a crowd of hundreds had gathered. The rioters, who "were recruited predominantly from the industrial artisans and labourers of Birmingham", threw stones at the departing guests and sacked the hotel. The crowd then moved on to the Quaker meeting-house, until someone yelled that the Quakers "never trouble themselves with anything, neither on one side nor the other" and convinced them instead to attack the New Meeting chapel, where Priestley presided as minister. The New and Old Meeting Houses, two Dissenting chapels, were set alight. Rail gives a very different account of the destruction of the two meeting houses, suggesting that two gangs from Coventry carried out the demolition, while the mobs were kept back by a small group of local boxers.

The rioters proceeded to Priestley's home, Fairhill at Sparkbrook. Priestley barely had time to evacuate and he and his wife fled from Dissenting friend to friend during the riots. Writing shortly after the event, Priestley described the first part of the attack, which he witnessed from a distance:

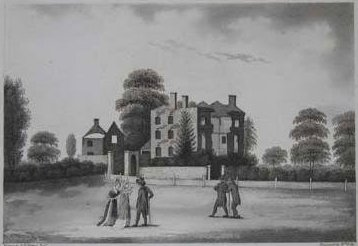
Joseph Priestley's home, Fairhill at Sparkbrook, Birmingham, after its destruction (etching by William Ellis after a drawing by P. H. Witton)

It being remarkably calm, and clear moon-light, we could see to a considerable distance, and being upon a rising ground, we distinctly heard all that passed at the house, every shout of the mob, and almost every stroke of the instruments they had provided for breaking the doors and the furniture. For they could not get any fire, though one of them was heard to offer two guineas for a lighted candle; my son, whom we left behind us, having taken the precaution to put out all the fires in the house, and others of my friends got all the neighbours to do the same. I afterwards heard that much pains was taken, but without effect, to get fire from my large electrical machine, which stood in the library.

His son, William, stayed behind with others to protect the family home, but they were overcome and the property was eventually looted and razed to the ground. Priestley's valuable library, scientific laboratory, and manuscripts were largely lost in the flames.

== 15, 16 and 17 July ==
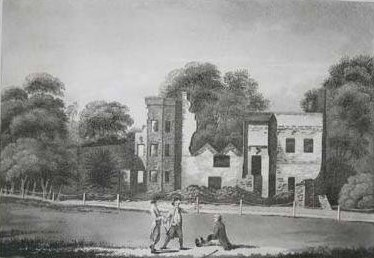
William Russell's home, Showell Green, Sparkhill after its destruction. (Etching by William Ellis, after a drawing by P. H. Witton)

The Earl of Aylesford attempted to stem the mounting violence on the night of 14 July, but despite having the help of other magistrates, he was unable to control the crowd. On 15 July, the mob liberated prisoners from the local gaol. Thomas Woodbridge, the Keeper of the Prison, deputised several hundred people to help him quell the mob, but many of these joined in with the rioters themselves. The crowd destroyed John Ryland's home, Baskerville House, and drank the supplies of liquor that they found in the cellar. When the newly appointed constables arrived on the scene, the mob attacked and disarmed them. One man was killed. The local magistrates and law enforcement, such as it was, did nothing further to restrain the mob and did not read the Riot Act until the military arrived on 17 July. Other rioters burned down banker John Taylor's home at Bordesley Park.

On 16 July, the homes of Joseph Jukes, John Coates, John Hobson, Thomas Hawkes, and John Harwood (the latter a blind Baptist minister) were all ransacked or burned. The Baptist Meeting at Kings Heath, another Dissenting chapel, was also destroyed. William Russell and William Hutton, tried to defend their homes, but to no avail—the men they hired refused to fight the mob. Hutton later wrote a narrative of the events:

I was avoided as a pestilence; the waves of sorrow rolled over me, and beat me down with multiplied force; every one came heavier than the last. My children were distressed. My wife, through long affliction, ready to quit my own arms for those of death; and I myself reduced to the sad necessity of humbly begging a draught of water at a cottage!...In the morning of the 15th I was a rich man; in the evening I was ruined.

When the rioters arrived at John Taylor's other house at Moseley, Moseley Hall, they carefully moved all of the furniture and belongings of its current occupant, the frail Dowager Lady Carhampton, a relative of George III, out of the house before they burned it: they were specifically targeting those who disagreed with the king's policies and who, in not conforming to the Church of England, resisted state control. The homes of George Russell, a Justice of the Peace, Samuel Blyth, one of the ministers of New Meeting, Thomas Lee, and a Mr. Westley all came under attack on the 15th and 16th. The manufacturer, Quaker, and member of the Lunar Society Samuel Galton only saved his own home by bribing the rioters with ale and money.

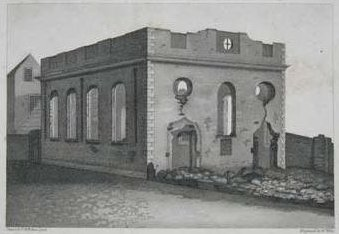
New Meeting, after its destruction (Etching by William Ellis after a drawing by P. H. Witton)

By 2 p.m. on 16 July, the rioters had left Birmingham and were heading towards Kings Norton and the Kingswood Chapel; it was estimated that one group of the rioters totalled 250 to 300 people. They burned Cox's farm at Warstock and looted and attacked the home of a Mr. Taverner. When they reached Kingswood, Warwickshire, they burned the Dissenting chapel and its manse. By this time, Birmingham had shut down—no business was being conducted.

Contemporary accounts record that the mob's last sustained assault was around 8 p.m. on 17 July. About 30 "hard core" rioters attacked the home of William Withering, an Anglican who attended the Lunar Society with Priestley and Keir but Withering, aided by a group of hired men, managed to fend them off. When the military finally arrived to restore order on 17 and 18 July, most of the rioters had disbanded, although there were rumours that mobs were destroying property in Alcester and Bromsgrove.

All in all, four Dissenting churches had been severely damaged or burned down and twenty-seven homes had been attacked, many looted and burned. Having begun by attacking those who attended the Bastille celebration, the "Church-and-King" mob had finished up by extending their targets to include Dissenters of all kinds as well as members of the Lunar Society.

== Aftermath and trials ==
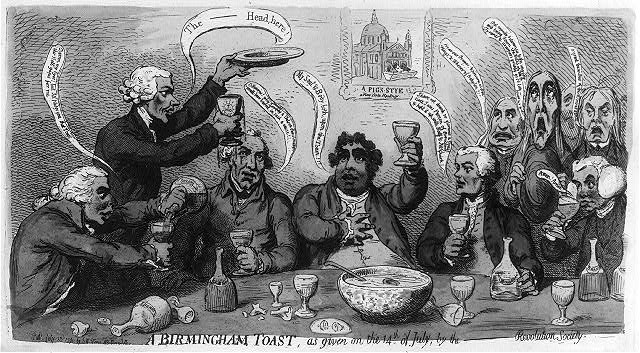
James Gillray's cartoon mocking the 14 July dinner

Priestley and other Dissenters blamed the government for the riots, believing that William Pitt and his supporters had instigated them; however, it seems from the evidence that the riots were actually organised by local Birmingham officials. Some of the rioters acted in a co-ordinated fashion and seemed to be led by local officials during the attacks, prompting accusations of premeditation. Some Dissenters discovered that their homes were to be attacked several days before the rioters arrived, leading them to believe that there was a prepared list of victims. The "disciplined nucleus of rioters", which numbered only thirty or so, directed the mob and stayed sober throughout the three to four days of rioting. Unlike the hundreds of others who joined in, they could not be bribed to stop their destructions. Essayist William Hazlitt's first published work was a letter to the Shrewsbury Chronicle, printed later in July 1791, condemning the Priestley riots; Priestley had been one of (then 13-year-old) Hazlitt's teachers.

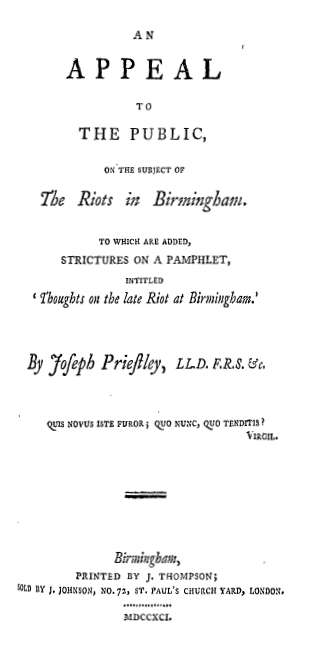
Title page from Priestley's Appeal (1791), which also contains reprints of contemporary news reports and letters concerning the riots

If a concerted effort had been made by Birmingham's Anglican elite to attack the Dissenters, it was more than likely the work of Benjamin Spencer, a local minister, Joseph Carles, a Justice of the Peace and landowner, and John Brooke, an attorney, coroner, and under-sheriff. Although present at the riot's outbreak, Carles and Spencer made no attempt to stop the rioters, and Brooke seems to have led them to the New Meeting chapel. Witnesses agreed "that the magistrates promised the rioters protection so long as they restricted their attacks to the meeting-houses and left persons and property alone". The magistrates also refused to arrest any of the rioters and released those that had been arrested. Instructed by the national government to prosecute the riot's instigators, these local officials dragged their heels. When finally forced to try the ringleaders, they intimidated witnesses and made a mockery of the trial proceedings. Only twenty-seven rioters were ever brought to trial; nine were convicted, seven were sentenced to hang. Of these seven, two were hanged at Worcester, two were hanged at Warwick, one was reprieved by the judge at the assizes, and two, Bartholomew Fisher and William Hands received Royal Pardons, which prompted a debate in Parliament. Priestley and others believed that the men who were hanged had been found guilty not because they were rioters but because "they were infamous characters in other respects".

Although he had been forced to send troops to Birmingham to quell the disturbances, King George III commented, "I cannot but feel better pleased that Priestley is the sufferer for the doctrines he and his party have instilled, and that the people see them in their true light." The cost of damages for the victims of the riots fell upon the ratepayers of the respective hundreds. The total eventually amounted to £23,000. However, the process took many years, and most sufferers received much less than the value of their property.

After the riots, Birmingham was, according to industrialist James Watt, "divided into two parties who hate one another mortally". Initially Priestley wanted to return and deliver a sermon on the Bible verse "Father, forgive them, for they know not what they do," but he was dissuaded by friends convinced that it was too dangerous. Instead, he wrote his Appeal:

I was born an Englishman as well [as] any of you. Though labouring under civil disabilities, as a Dissenter, I have long contributed my share to the support of government, and supposed I had the protection of its constitution and laws for my inheritance. But I have found myself greatly deceived; and so may any of you, if, like me, you should, with or without cause, be so unfortunate as to incur popular odium. For then, as you have seen in my case, without any form of trial whatever, without any intimation of your crime, or of your danger, your houses and all your property may be destroyed, and you may not have the good fortune to escape with life, as I have done....What are the old French Lettres de Cachet, or the horrors of the late demolished Bastille, compared to this?

The riots revealed that the Anglican gentry of Birmingham were not averse to using violence against Dissenters whom they viewed as potential revolutionaries. They had no qualms, either, about raising a potentially uncontrollable mob. Many of those attacked left Birmingham; as a result, the town became noticeably more conservative after the riots. The remaining supporters of the French Revolution decided not to hold a dinner celebrating the storming of the Bastille the next year.

== See also ==
- Derby Museum and Art Gallery

== Bibliography ==
- —. An Authentic Account of the Riots in Birmingham, also … the trials of the Rioters. Birmingham: n.p., 1791.
- —. Views of the Ruins of the Principal Houses Destroyed during the Riots at Birmingham. London: J. Johnson, 1791.
- Butler, Marilyn, ed. Burke, Paine, Godwin, and the Revolution Controversy. Cambridge: Cambridge University Press, 2002. ISBN 0-521-28656-5.
- Hutton, William. "A Narrative of the Riots in Birmingham, July 1791". The Life of William Hutton. London: Printed for Baldwin, Cradock, and Joy, Paternoster Row; and Beilby and Knotts, Birmingham, 1816. Google Books. Retrieved on 28 February 2008.
- Maddison, R. E. S. and Francis R. Maddison. "Joseph Priestley and the Birmingham Riots." Notes and Records of the Royal Society of London 12.1 (August, 1956): 98–113.
- Martineau, Dennis. "Playing Detective: The Priestley Riots of 1791." Birmingham Historian 12–13 (1997): 11–18.
- Priestley, Joseph. An Appeal to the Public on the Subject of the Riots in Birmingham. Birmingham: Printed by J. Thompson, 1791. On line, Internet Archive.
- Rail, Tony. Sentenced to Hang; Memoirs of Billy Hands, 1768-1853). Sudbury, William Tabb (2026).
- Rose, R. B. "The Priestley Riots of 1791." Past and Present 18 (1960): 68–88.
- Schofield, Robert E. The Enlightened Joseph Priestley: A Study of His Life and Work from 1773 to 1804. University Park: Pennsylvania State University Press, 2004. ISBN 0-271-02459-3.
- Sheps, Arthur. "Public Perception of Joseph Priestley, the Birmingham Dissenters, and the Church-and-King Riots of 1791." Eighteenth-Century Life 13.2 (1989): 46–64.
