= Robert Melville Grindlay =

British soldier, banker and artist (1786–1877)

Captain Robert Melville Grindlay FRSA MRAS FZS FRHS FRBS
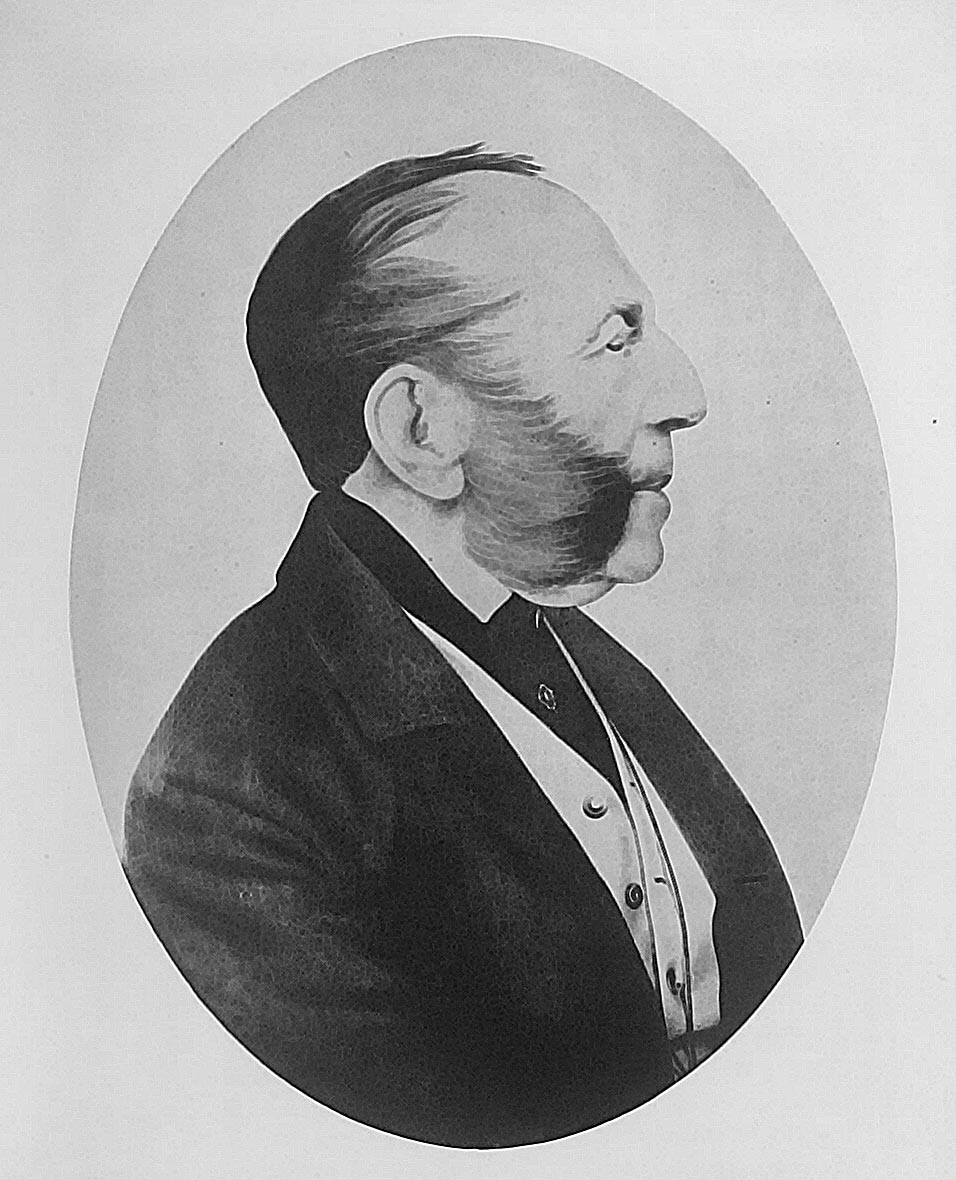
- Engraving of Capt. R M Grindlay
- Born: 23 October 1786; Marylebone, London, England
- Died: 9 December 1877 (aged 91); Nice, Provence-Alpes-Côte d'Azur, France
- Occupations: Soldier; Artist; Draughtsman; Banker; Agent; Author
- Known for: Banking to the British Empire; Paintings of the Indian subcontinent
- Title: Founder of Grindlays Bank; Aide-de-camp of the Governor of the Bombay Presidency (Sir Evan Nepean); Captain of 2nd Battalion of the 7th Bombay Native Infantry (East India Company – Bombay Army); Secretary of the Committee of Embarkation of Bombay; London agent of the Steam Committees of Calcutta and Madras
- Spouse: Maria Susannah Grindlay (née Commerell) (m. 1821)
- Children: Robert Melville Grindlay (son)
- Parents: The Rev. Dr John Grindlay (father); Elizabeth Grindlay (mother)
- Relatives: See footnotes
- Family: Grindlay

Captain Robert Melville Grindlay FRSA MRAS FZS FRHS FRBS^{[a]} (23 October 1786 – 9 December 1877) was a British soldier, artist, and banker during the 18th and 19th centuries. Born in London, England, he served as an East India Company agent in the Bombay Army, during which time he made a large collection of sketches and drawings of the Indian subcontinent. Upon returning to England he founded the multinational commercial firm Grindlays Bank and various philanthropic initiatives.

== Early years and family ==
Grindlay was born on 23 October 1786, one of eight children,^{[b]}^{[c]} to The Reverend Dr John Grindlay DCL LLD (1756–1818) and his wife Elizabeth (d.1843) in the village of St. Mary-le-Bone (now Marylebone) near London, and baptised on 17 November of that same year at St Marylebone Parish Church.^{[d]}

His grandparents James (died 1765) and Christina Grindlay (née Govan), attorneys at law, had emigrated to Charleston, South Carolina from Glasgow, Scotland during the early 18th century, after previous generations had resettled in Lanarkshire from the North Midlands. However, his father returned to the United Kingdom and attended Emmanuel College, Cambridge, before taking up various ecclesiastical positions at Oxford Chapel, Marylebone, Bishop's Caundle Church, Dorest, and the Church of St. Mary the Virgin, Horne, Surrey, as well various charitable enterprises, including The Philanthropic Society.

Grindlay was educated in London and left school at the age of 17, having secured a position as a cadet in the Honourable East India Company (HEIC).

== Military service ==
Grindlay served in the 7th Bombay Infantry of the Bombay Army, the military arm of the East India Company, from 1804 to 1820. He was made a cadet in 1802 aged 17, following a nomination by E Parry Esq. secured for him by his father, and sailed to India the following year on the maiden voyage of the East Indiaman, the Prince of Wales, in 1803. He became a Lieutenant in 1804, and reached the rank of Captain in 1817, before retiring from the military in 1820 at the age of 34.

During his time in the military, Grindlay held several staff positions in the Bombay Presidency of British India as well as acting Captain of 2nd Battalion of the 7th Bombay Native Infantry, including Secretary of the Committee of Embarkation of Bombay and Aide-de-camp of Sir Evan Nepean, 1st Baronet, the Governor of Bombay.

Grindlay undertook numerous military expeditions while in India, including a diplomatic mission to the court of the Talpur Amirs of Sindh in 1808, which formed part of the prelude to the Amir signature of a treaty of "friendship" with the British in 1809. Having taken an interest in the history and geography of north-western India, he kept a diary of his travels, including the journey from Lukhpat in Cutch, India to Hyderabad in Sindh, Pakistan along the Kori and Narra rivers by way of Sindhri, to meet with Mir Ghulam Ali Talpur, the ruling Amir. Several extracts of his journal were used to form part of the best selling memoir of Captain Sir Alexander Burnes, Travels into Bokhara, first published in 1835.

In 1813, Grindlay was given leave to accompany Mary Elizabeth Frederica Mackenzie, then Lady Hood, on a sketching expedition across Peninsula India. They stopped for two months in Poona, where he drew a number of portraits for Mountstuart Elphinstone, British Envoy to the Court of Kabul, for his report on the expedition to Shah Shuja Durrani, Emir of the Durrani Empire, An Account of the Kingdom of Caubul, and its Dependencies in Persia, Tartary, and India, published in 1815. Grindlay later presented the original aquatints to William Elphinstone, 15th Lord Elphinstone for his biography of Mountstuart following his death in 1859.

== Marriage ==
Grindlay returned to England from India in 1820 and married Maria Susannah Commerell on 20 July 1821 at St Marylebone Parish Church. Maria was the daughter of John William Commerell, of Strood Green near Horsham, a Sheriff of Sussex, whose family originated from Heilbronn in Swabia, Germany,^{[e]} where they were privy councillors and confidents of the Dukes of Württemberg; and his wife, Mary (nee Bosanquet) of Dingestow Court.

The couple established themselves at their principle London home at North Bank, Regent's Park, in the parish of St. Marylebone, and had a son, Robert Melville Grindlay, born on 12 September 1821 and baptised on 24 September 1821 at St Marylebone Parish Church, but who died in infancy later that same year.

Grindlay was uncle-in-law to Sir John Edmund Commerell, Admiral of the Fleet and William Augustus Commerell, a first-class cricketer.

== Banking and commerce ==
=== Grindlays Bank ===
After returning to England, Grindlay maintained his influential Anglo-Indian connections and his correspondence with friends and former colleagues. Drawing on his extensive knowledge and experience of the region he undertook a growing number of personal commissions of assistance, to the point where in 1828 he founded Leslie & Grindlay, to provide similar services to the wider public on a permanent business basis. Initially the company arranged passage to and from India for customers and their baggage, but in time added private banking activities to their services, eventually becoming the principle bankers to the Presidency Armies of the East India Company, the British Indian Army, and the business community in India.

The company was first based in Birchin Lane, off Lombard Street in London and began by acting as agents to help secure the travel arrangements of its clientele, to and from India, procuring sea passages, clearing and shipping baggage, as well as providing advisory services including extensive kit lists, route maps and costings for East India Company employees and British officials. Expansion saw the business open other offices in the City of London (Cornhill and Bishopsgate) and Westminster (Whitehall and St James's Square).

Under the guidance and direction of Grindlay, these services shifted over time towards financial operations, including banking, insurance, savings and encashment of cheques and drafts, and operational expansion to include the Indian subcontinent, the Middle East and elements of Africa and Southeast Asia. During this same period various partner additions, mergers, and acquisitions resulted in the firm undergoing several name changes, being styled Grindlay, Christian & Matthews from 1839, Grindlay & Co from 1843, Grindlay & Co Ltd from 1924 and Grindlays Bank Ltd in 1947, until its merger with the National Bank of India in 1958 when it became National and Grindlays Bank.

By 1842, when Grindlay retired, the firm had become "the most distinguished bankers and agents to the civil and military officials of the business community and the British army in India".

==== Timeline ====
Key events during the tenure of Captain Grindlay:

- 1828 – Grindlay established Leslie & Grindlay in Birchin Lane, London (which included a reading room, where travellers could meet and discuss the latest developments in India)
- 1830 – Leslie left the firm
- 1830 – Firm headquarters moved to 16 Cornhill Street, London (next to The Royal Exchange)
- 1835 – Additional offices and West End reading room opened at 8 St. Martins Place, London (adjacent to St Martin-in-the-Fields and Trafalgar Square)
- 1839 – Restyled as Grindlay, Christian & Matthews after Grindlay took on additional partners
- 1842 – Grindlay retires from the firm aged 56

=== East India Company ===
Grindlay was a major "proprietor of East India stock" with a significant stake and considerable influence in the East India Company during the 19th century. He was a central actor in the debating and eventual approval of the Saint Helena Act 1833, being named alongside 27 other stockholders, Members of Parliament, and company directors and chairman, including William Wigram, William Astell, Richard Twining, Sir Charles Mills, Sir Francis Molyneux Ommanney, George Lyall, Sir James Rivett-Carnac and Sir Richard Jenkins, in formal East India House communications.

The Act provided a 20-year extension of the royal charter granted to the East India Company, allowing it to maintain its political and administrative duties in India, but with a number of additional provisions which continued the successive reduction in the company's commercial rights and trading monopolies, seen in the charters of 1793, 1813, 1833 and 1853. (Note: The citation of this act by this short title was authorised by section 5 of, and the second schedule to, the Statute Law Revision Act 1948. Due to the repeal of those provisions, it is now authorised by section 19(2) of the Interpretation Act 1978.)

=== Freemasonry ===
On 20 May 1836, Grindlay was initiated into the Freemasons and registered as a member of the United Grand Lodge of England, continuing the association of the Grindlay family with the fraternal organisation and their collective charitable contributions and public works.

== Artist and author ==
=== Artist and draftsman ===
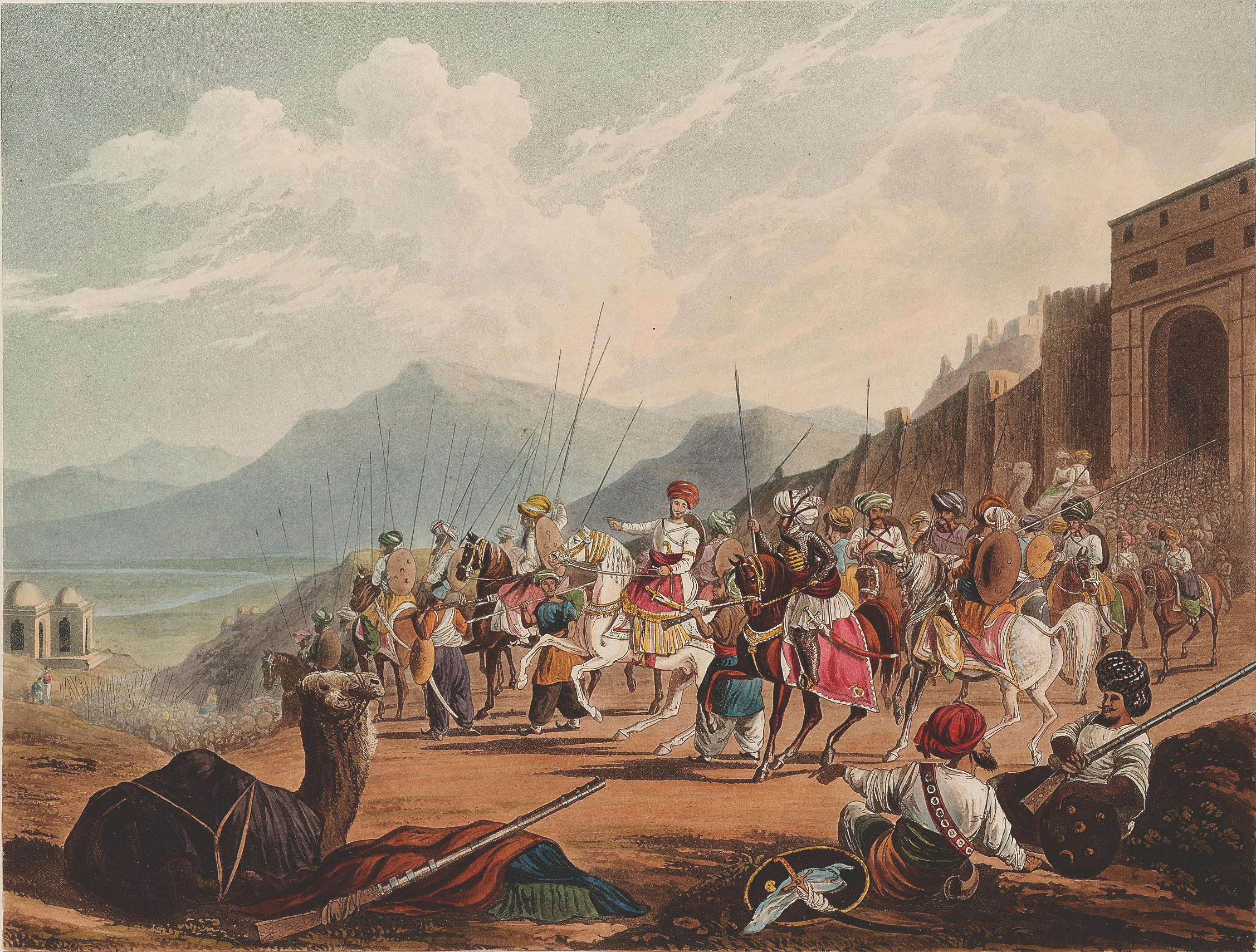
The Rajah of Cutch with his vassals, by Robert Melville Grindlay, 1826

Grindlay kept a detailed personal journal of his time in India, and made numerous sketches and paintings of his travels across the Indian subcontinent. Widely regarded as a "gifted amateur artist", he sketched hundreds of landscapes in Gujarat, the Deccan, and along the coast, with 24 of his works featuring in over 75 publications, and now held across 439 separate library holdings (as of 2021). These include the works of Captain Sir Alexander Burnes, Mountstuart Elphinstone, and Lieutenant-General Sir Henry Pottinger, 1st Baronet and his Travels in Beloochistan and Sinde, first published in 1816, along with many others.

The most famous and comprehensive of these collected works is the best selling Scenery, Costumes and Architecture chiefly on the Western Side of India. This series was first published in 6 parts comprising 6 plates each, 36 in total, hand-coloured aquatints with accompanying explanatory descriptions and annotations in 1830 by Smith, Elder & Co, having been started by Rudolph Ackermann in 1826. On completion of the serial issues, the book was also released as a whole by Smith, Elder & Co and issued in one or two volumes, folio copies of which have sold for upwards of £25,000.00. The majority of his published works are engravings of original sketches then overpainted with oils.

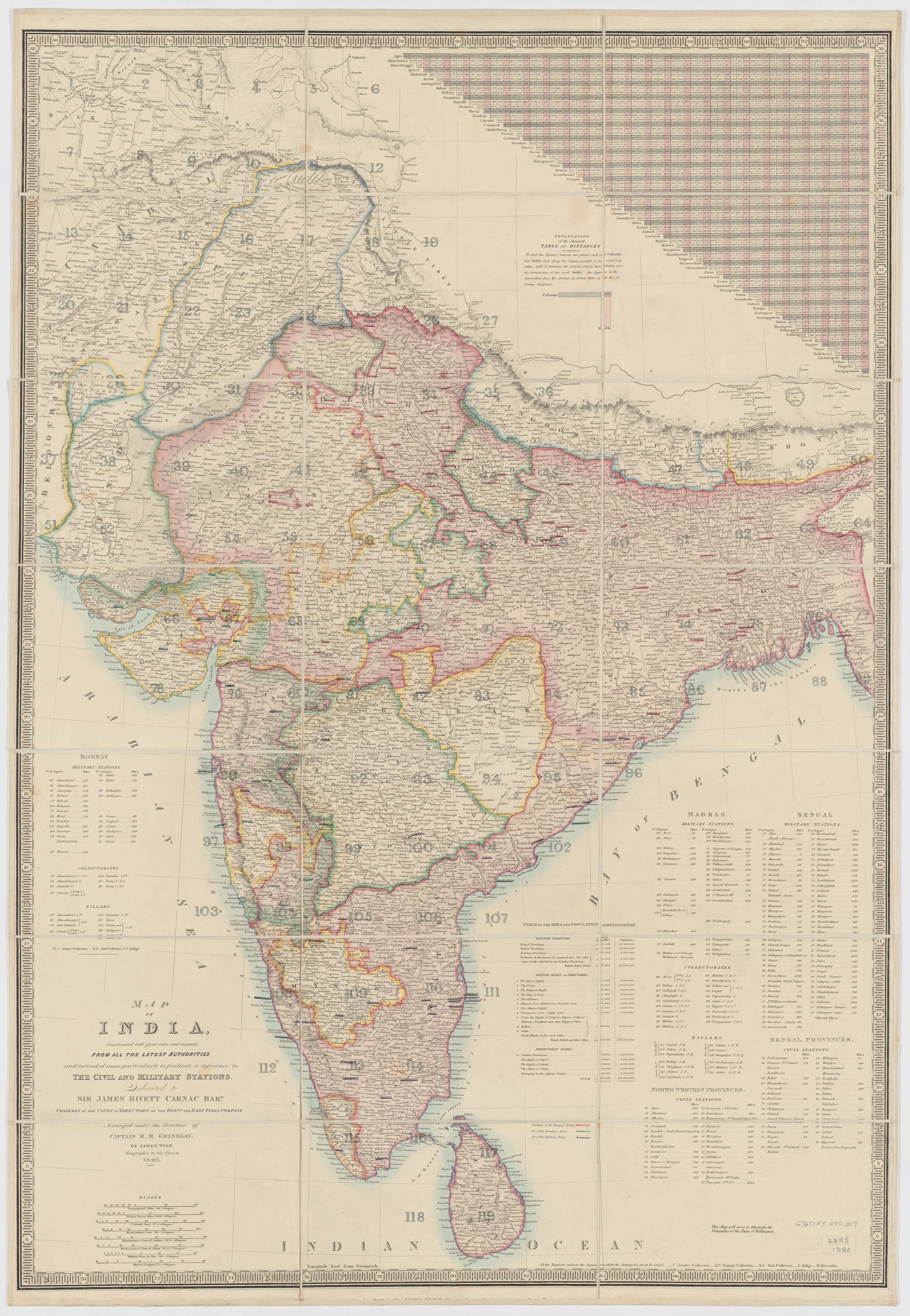
Map of India arranged and constructed under the direction of Capt. R.M. Grindlay, by James Wyld, Geographer to Queen Victoria and Prince Albert, 1840

Reviews of Scenery, Costumes and Architecture chiefly on the Western Side of India in The Byron Gallery (1833):

"If there has been any foundation for the complaint, that the splendid scenery and gorgeous architecture of India have never yet been adequately pourtrayed [portrayed] by the pencil, it will vanish when this work shall be known, which certainly equals, if it does not transcend, any antecedent production of the graphic art. This work bids fair, not merely to establish the fame of Captain Grindlay, but to do honour to the British arts" – Asiatic Journal

"Captain Grindlay gives by this specimen of his labours, ample proof of genius, talent, and industry, exercised to high advantage during his service in the 'farther East;' the work will be appreciated as it deserves and admired for the fidelity as well as the spirit with which the scenes are brought before the eye. It embraces scenes and subjects from the Mahratta country to the banks of the Indus, and is as varied as it is undoubtedly beautiful. This splendid publication will be highly acceptable to all persons interested in Indian subjects and fully deserves the patronage already bestowed upon it" – Oriental Herald

"The fidelity of the representations is very striking; and all the plates are most acceptable, as illustrating an extremely interesting and important country, hitherto little known either literary or graphic means. The variety of views and the handsome style in which executed, will, together with the descriptions, recommend this only to persons connected with India, but the British public generally and collectors in the arts Literary Gazette" – Literary Gazette

"We consider it only just to a work of the highest class, to say, that having seen Captain Grindlay's Views on the Scenery, Costume, Architecture of the Western side of India, we cannot hesitate to pronounce its illustrations beautiful – they are admirable specimens of the art, and the manner in which they are coloured and gotten up, reflects infinite credit on spirited publishers" – John Bull

Grindlay presented a copy of his Scenery, Costumes and Architecture chiefly on the Western Side of India to Sir Thomas Lawrence, President of the Royal Academy in 1829 and later to Prince Albert and his groom-in-waiting General Sir Francis Seymour in 1840.

His artistic skills were also employed in overseeing the creation of various maps of India during the British occupation, most notable of which was the Map of India; constructed with great care and research from all the latest authorities and intended more particularly to facilitate a reference to the civil and military stations. The map was drawn up by The Rt Hon. James Wyld MP FRGS, the Geographer Royal of England, under the direction of Grindlay and relying heavily on his detailed knowledge and experience of the region.

Grindlay also assisted Colonel Monier Williams, Surveyor-General in the Bombay presidency, on his surveying of Gujarat and the Western Presidency.

=== Author and pamphleteer ===
==== Steam Communication with India ====
Although likely initially motivated by classical imperial capitalism, Grindlay's experiences in South Asia lead to his becoming an ardent Indophile, committed to the strengthening of the Indian economy and infrastructure. In his role as London agent to the Stream Committees of the Indian Presidencies during the Company Raj, Grindlay advocated strongly for the establishment of regular and permanent communications by steam vessels between Great Britain and India, for the benefit of both countries.

Between 1834 and 1836, Grindlay published the first edition of his A view of the present state of the question as to steam communication with India, in which he laments the slow government action following an enquiry by a committee of the House of Commons to investigate the "practicability and expediency of establishing, on a permanent footing, a system of steam communication with India" on 14 July 1834. The pamphlet details the economic benefits of the proposed route between England and India via the Red Sea, incorporating detailed financial calculations, maps of proposed routes, and widely signed petitions from across the Indian Presidencies in support of its establishment.

Reviews of A view of the present state of the question as to steam communication with India (1837):

"For seven or eight years past the propriety of establishing a regular and permanent Steam Communication between the protecting and dependent country has been discussed. The advocates of such communication have now assumed a very determined attitude...The signal gun has already been discharged by Captain Grindlay. This gentleman having been appointed agent for all the Presidencies has commenced his duties by the issue of a Pamphlet on the state of the question as to Steam Communication with India" – United Service Journal

"This important subject is here handled in so masterly a manner by Captain Grindlay, the statements are so clear, the illustrations so lucid, and the arguments and inference so strong and legitimate, that we think we shall do most justice to the author by freely quoting from the Pamphlet itself...Captain Grindlay's observations on this point and sincerely trust that the ensuing Session of Parliament will not pass without some effective steps being taken by the legislature for the establishment of such a rapid and certain communication with India as our national interests and the cause of humanity and civilization demand...We feel the country to be deeply indebted to Captain Grindlay for his exertions and we trust the day will come when he will not go unrewarded." – Mining Railway and Steam Navigation Gazette

Two further editions of the pamphlet were issued in 1837, and continued the drive for improved communications and reiterated Grindlay's belief that unexplored networks of cotton, jute, spices and tea in India could help Britain's ancillary industries in the east, and also overcome the expenditure of sustaining Britain's enmity with China. The political pressure of Grindlay's pamphleteering and outspoken support for steam communications via the Red Sea, helped to stimulate the creation of the Suez Canal, opening as it did in 1869.

==== Steamship Press ====
The Grindlay & Co. Overland Circular: Hints for Travellers to India, China, and Australia, 1854

Towards the end of his time at Grindlay, Christian & Matthews, Grindlay had begun to supply a weekly 'budget' or communiqué of home news for the Indian newspapers. The success of this bulletin prompted the partners to transfer printing to London and then dispatch the news sheets to India, thereby improving efficiency, and to expand the remit to include logistical advice for travellers. Printing the paper in England for a predominately British expatriate audience across the British Empire, made it part of a nineteenth century publishing phenomenon, known as the "steamship press". This more substantial periodical attributed to Grindlay, became the Grindlay & Co's Overland Circulator, and amassed a wide readership including military, medical, ecclesiastical, political and aristocratic personnel.

On 7 January 1847, Grindlay & Co published the first edition of its The Home News: A Summary of European Intelligence for India and the Colonies, a comprehensive journal, that further built on Grindlay's earlier work. Considered a "first rank among the journals of India", and "resemble[ing] the Spectator in substance", The Home News hit peak circulation in 1862 with 15,000 copies sold, after which technological advance, principally electrical telegraphy, meant it was no long required and publication ceased in 1898 with edition 2970. Its editors included Charles 'Shirley' Brooks, Thomas Escott, and George Sala.

== Later years ==
Grindlay retired from banking and all other business activities in 1842, at the age of 56. He and his wife Maria afterwards moved to Nice, Provence-Alpes-Côte d'Azur, France where he focused on his artistic passions in the "shadow of the Maritime Alps", and resided for the rest of his life, dying in 1877 at the age of 91. Maria remained in Nice, later dying there herself.

== Cultural depictions ==
Grindlay has featured in a number of books, journals, and articles since his death in 1877, covering his life and achievements including 100 Years of Banking in Asia and Africa by Geoffrey Tyson in 1963, British Multinational Banking 1830–1990 by Geoffrey Jones in 1993, and A History of the British Conquest of Afghanistan and Western India by Frank H Wallis in 2011.

Both he, and Grindlays Bank, appear in the Sherlock Holmes pastiche novel Sergeant Verity and the Blood Royal by Donald Serrell Thomas, published under his pseudonym Francis Selwyn in 1979, which sees the protagonist policemen, Sergeant William Clarence Verity, protect the Prince of Wales during a trip to America in the 1860s.

== Gallery ==
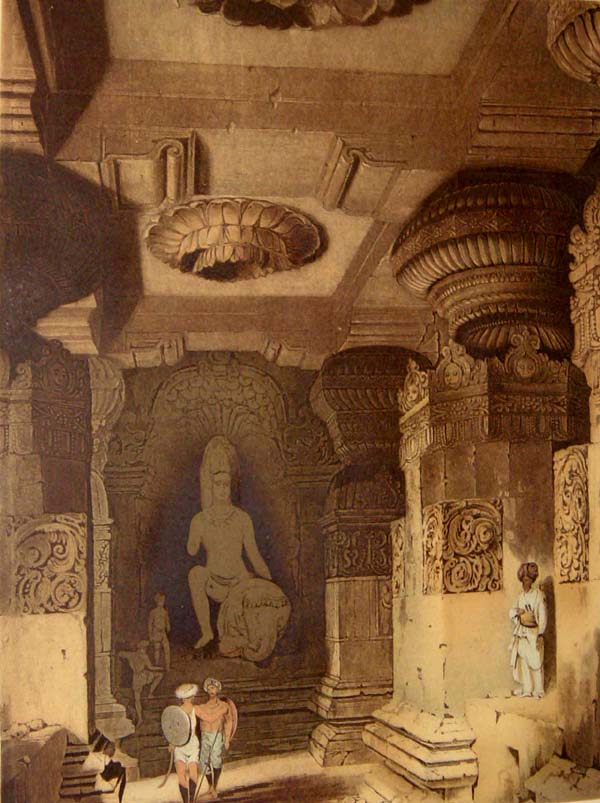
"Great Excavated Temple at Ellora" 1813

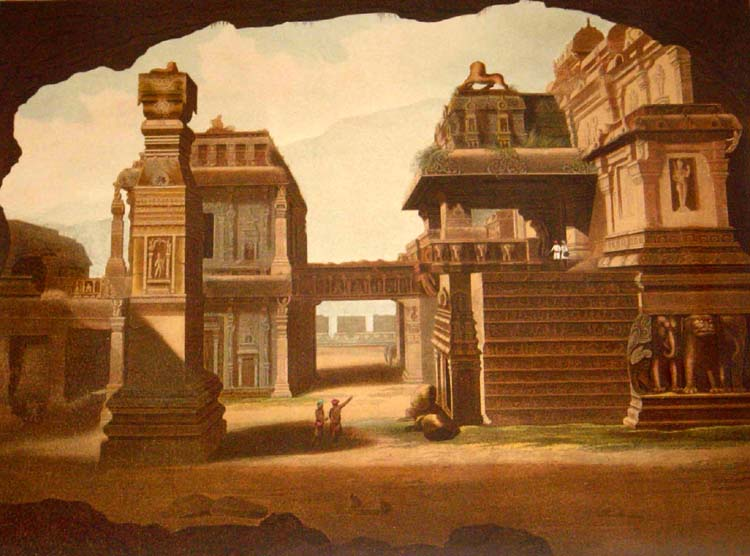
"Great Excavated Temple at Ellora" 1813

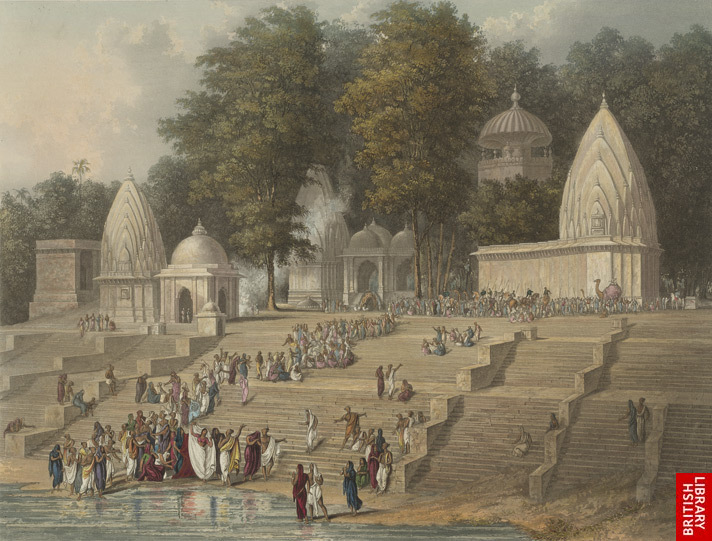
"Preparation for a Suttee" 1816

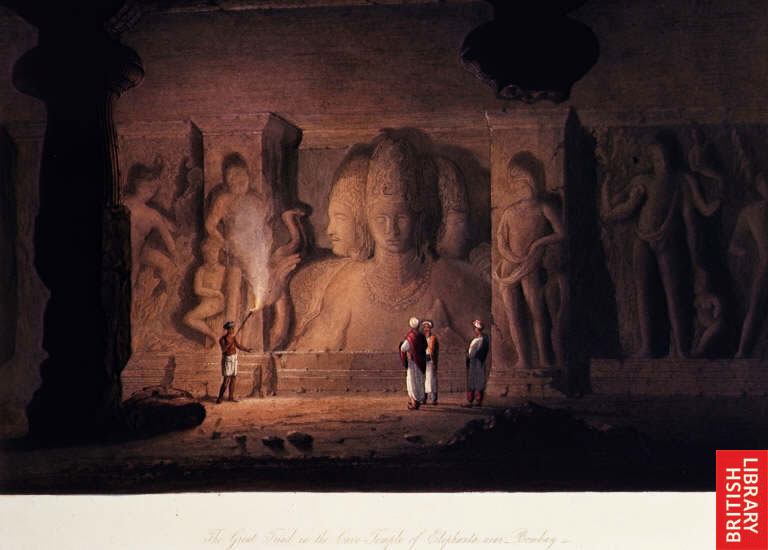
"The Great Triad in the Cave Temple of Elephanta near Bombay" 1830

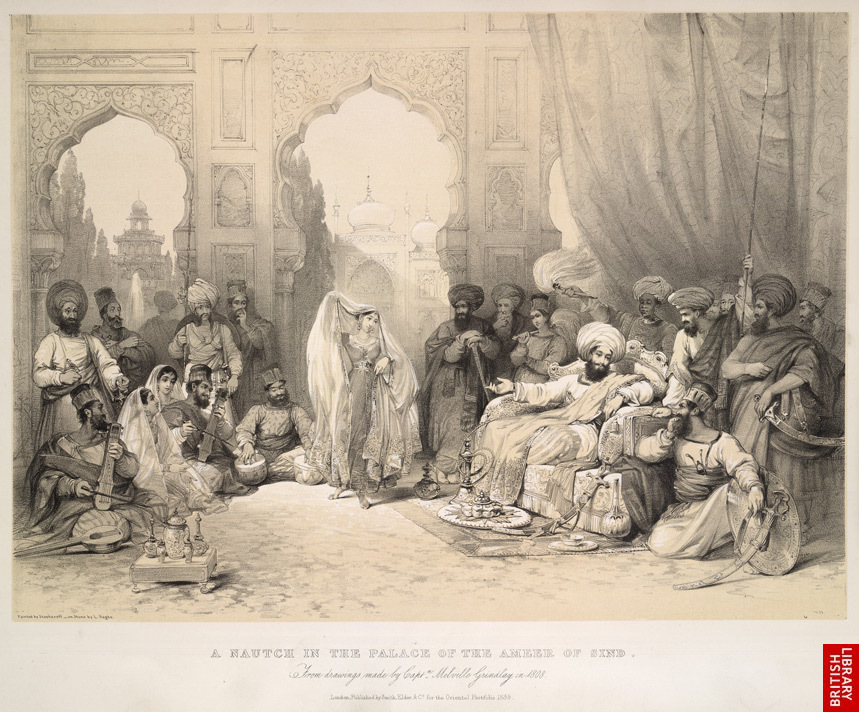
"A Nautch in the Palace of the Ameer of Sind" 1808

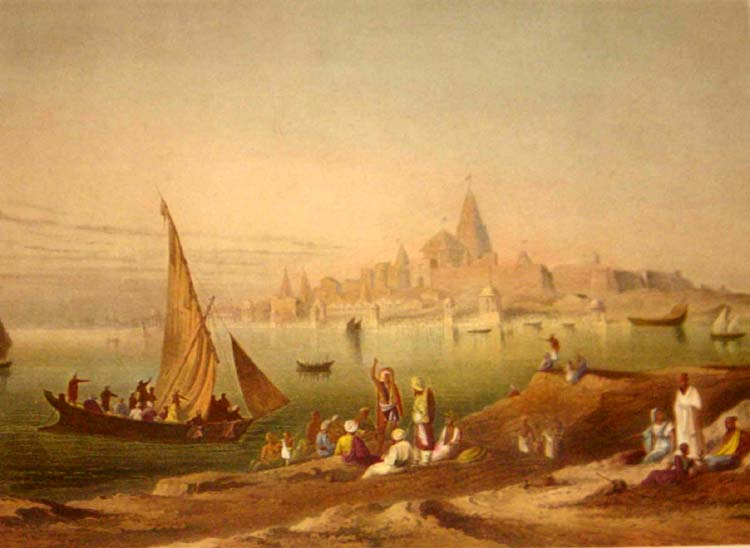
"The sacred town and temples of Dwarka" 1826

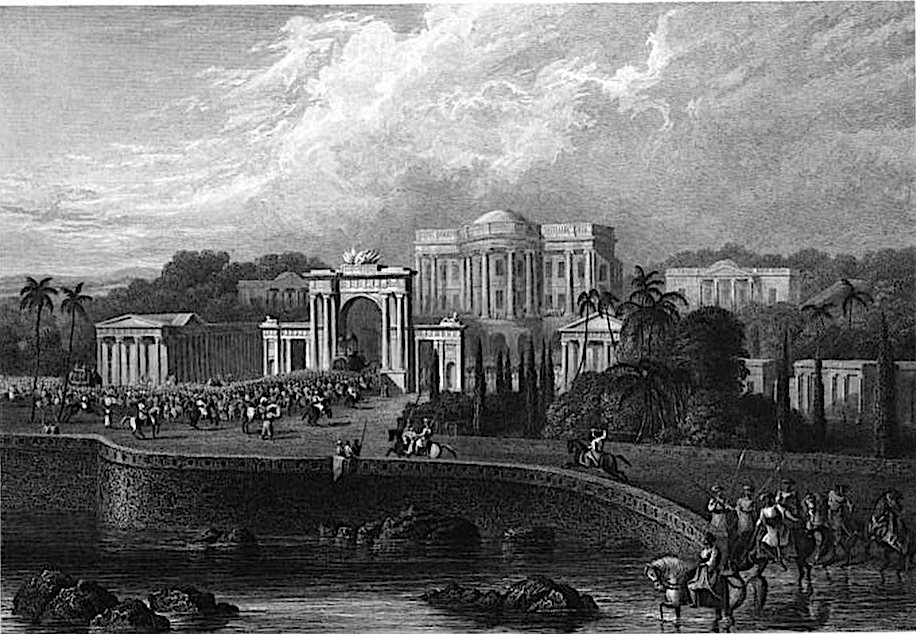
"The British Residency" 1834

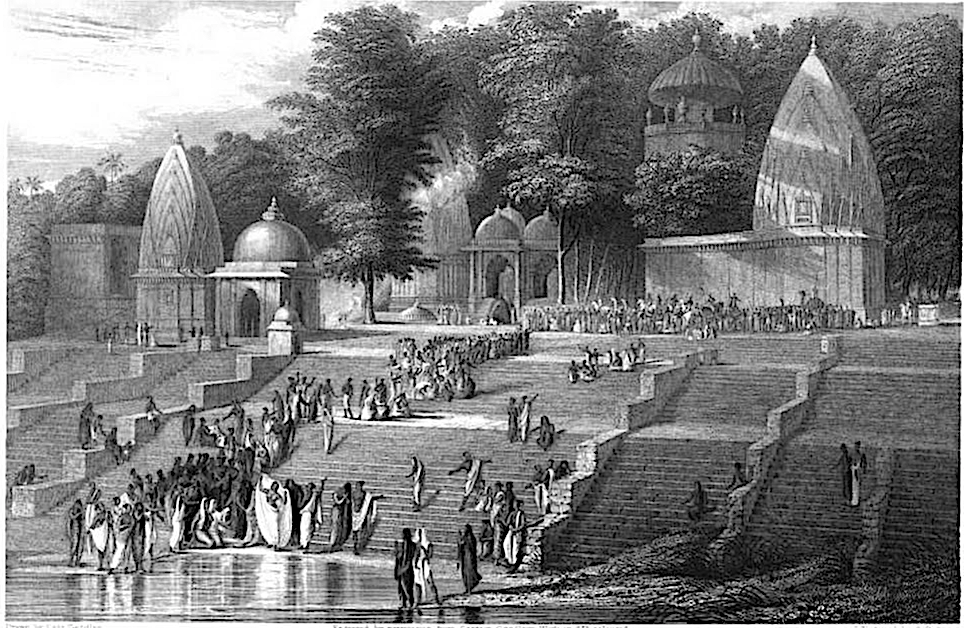
"A Suttee" 1836

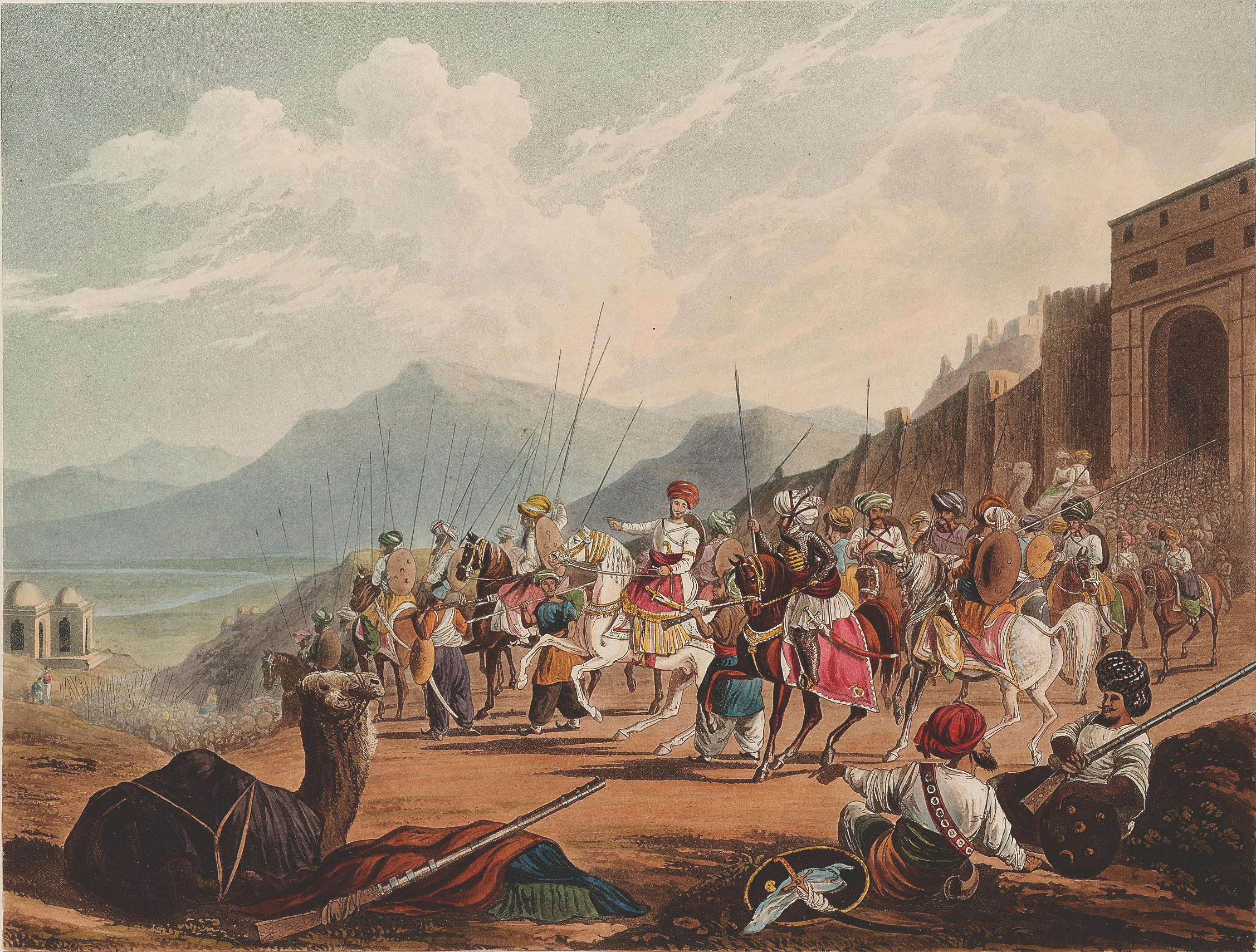
"The Rajah of Cutch with his vassalls" 1826

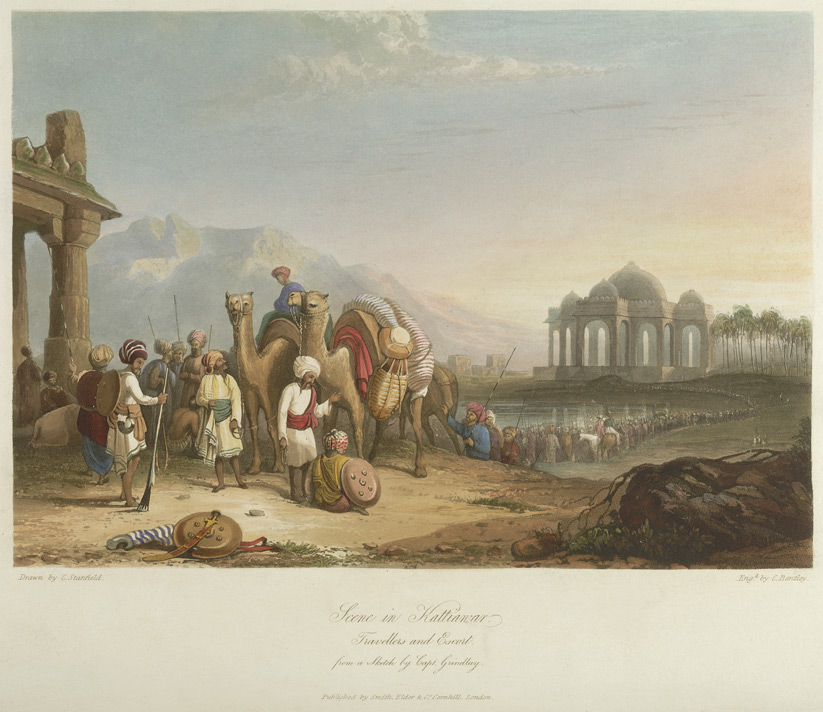
"Scene in Kattiawar, Travellers and Escort" 1830

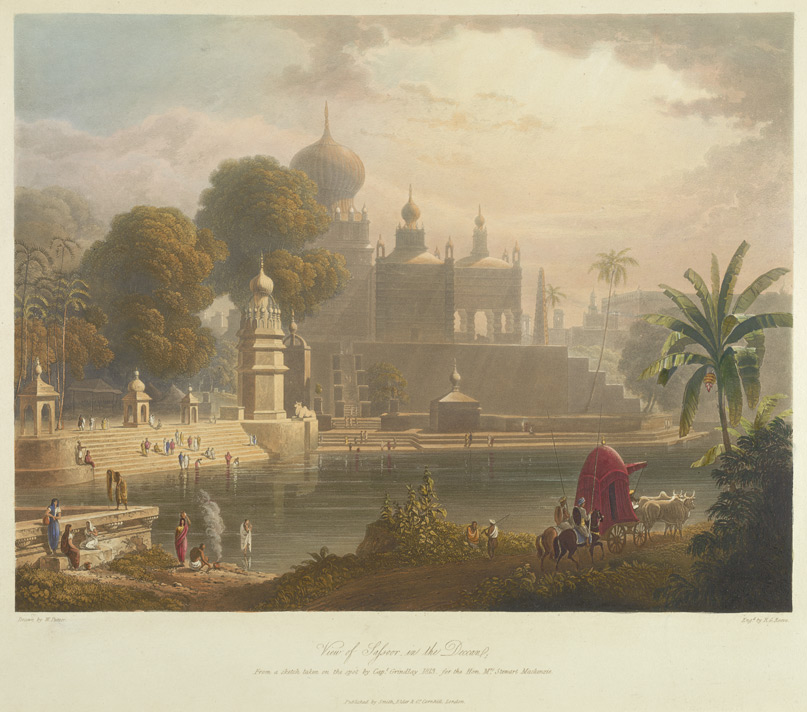
"View of Sassoor in the Decan" 1813.

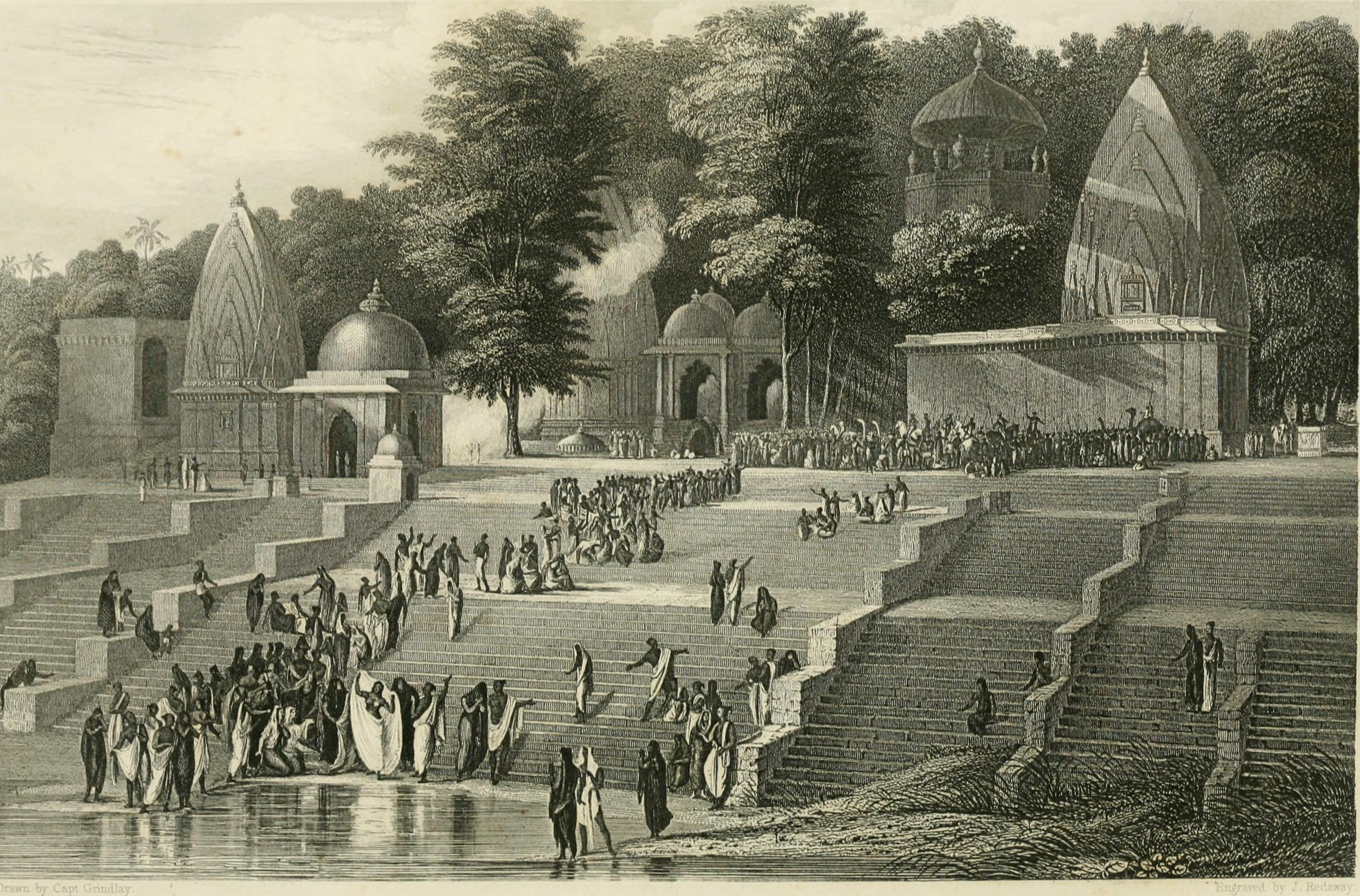
"Preparation for a Suttee, or the Immolation of a Hindoo Widow" 1858

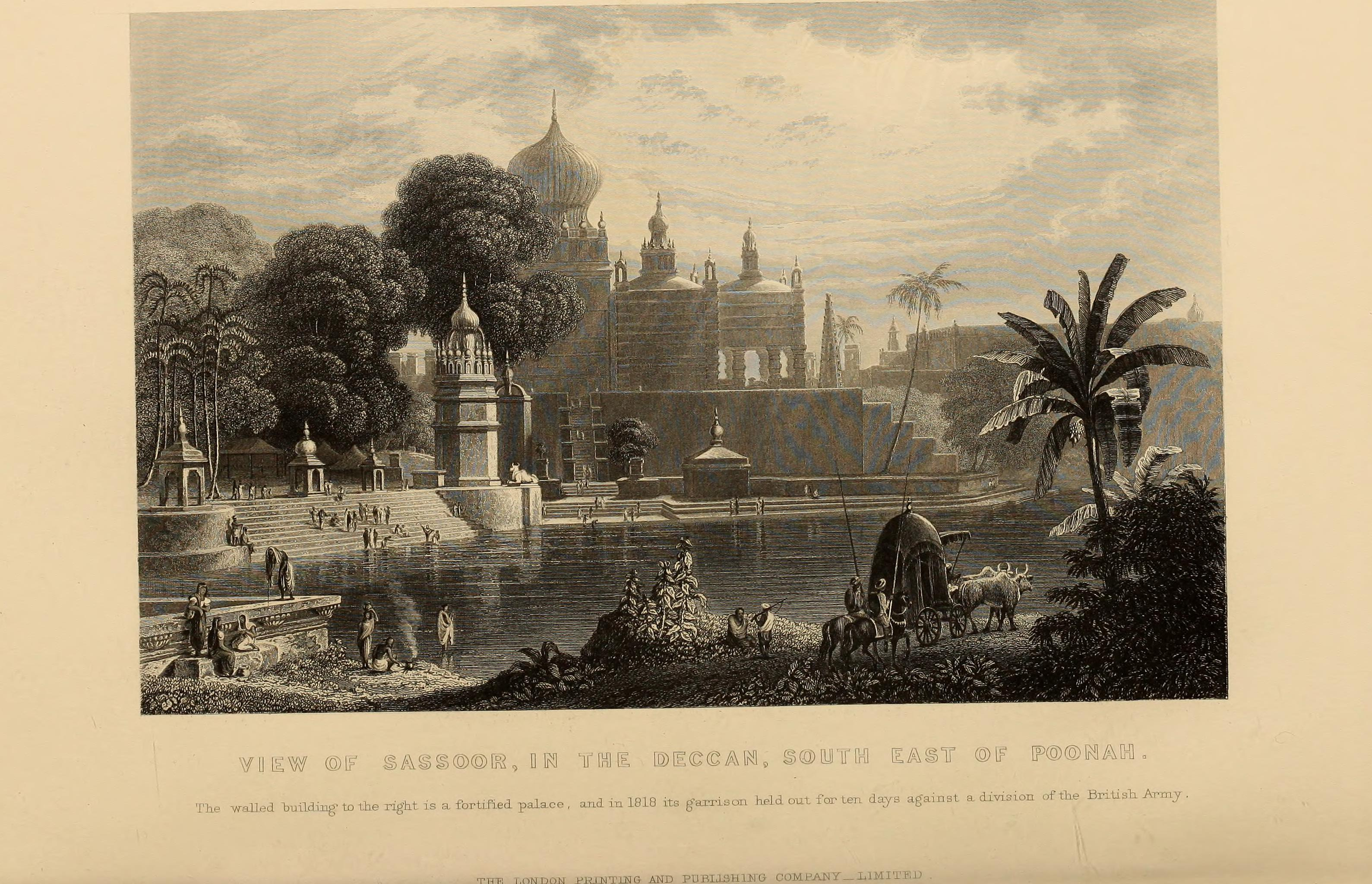
"View of Sassoor in the Deccan, South East of Poonah" 1858

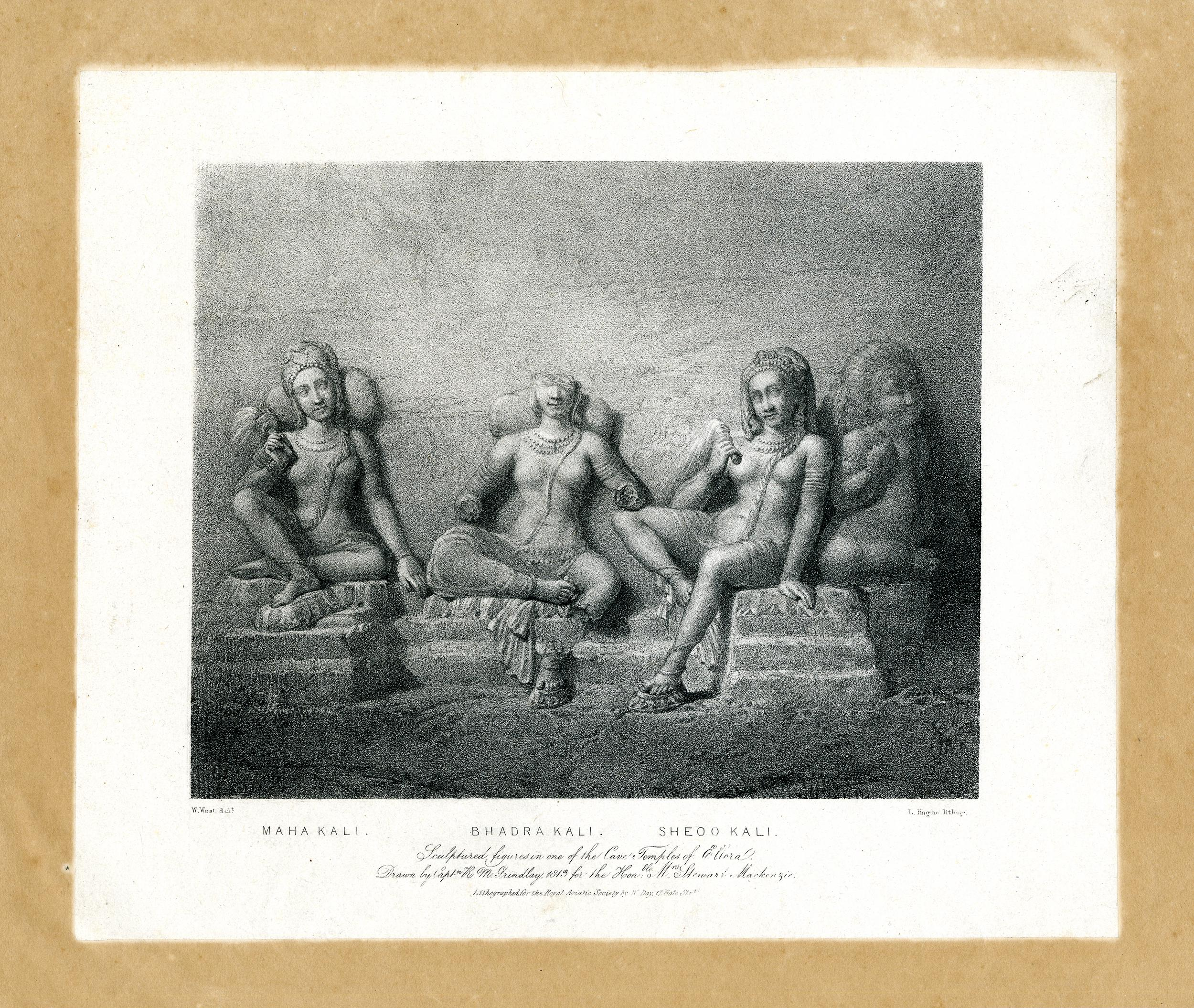
"Maha Kali. Bhadra Kali. Sheoo Kali" 1824-1834

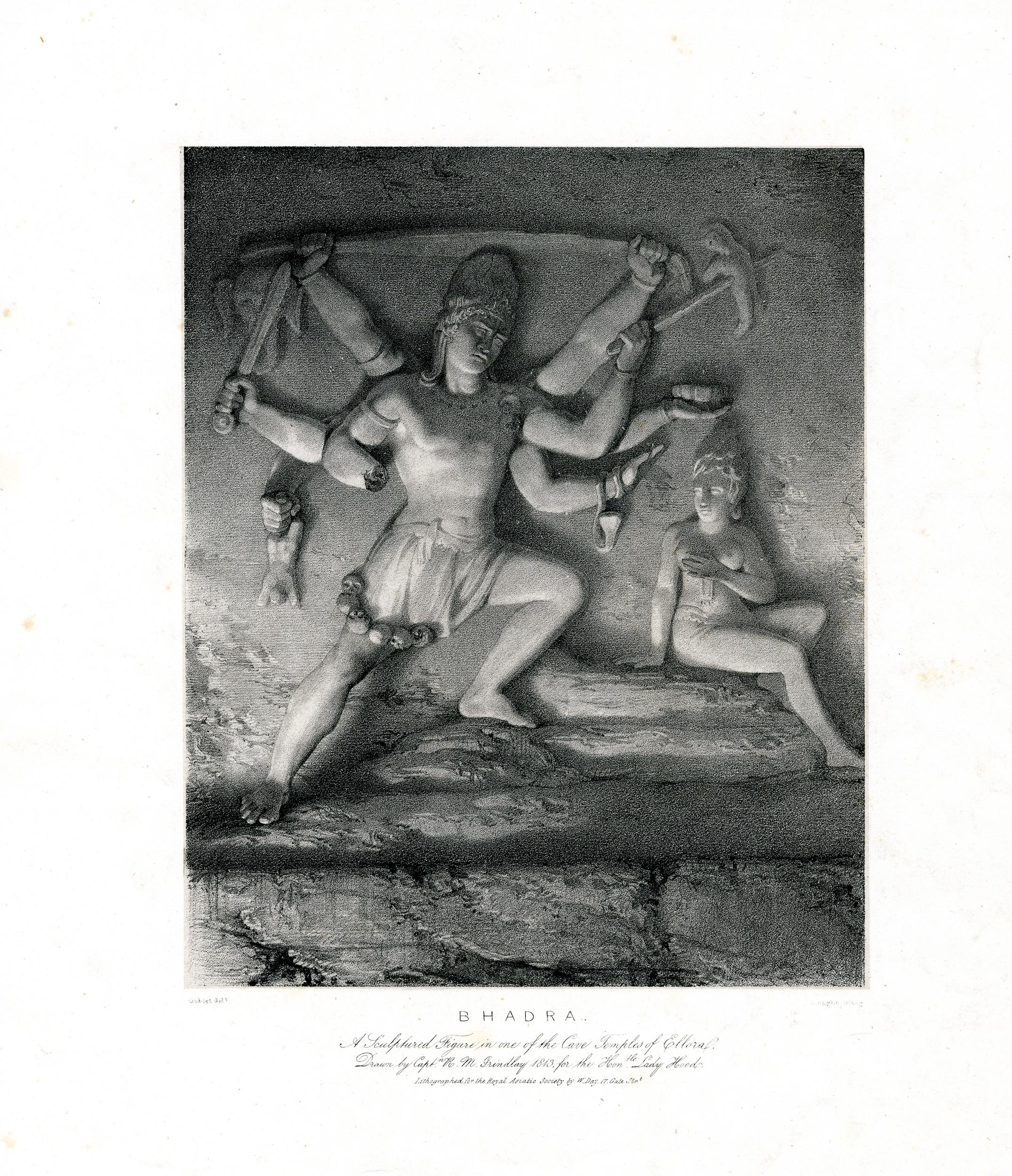
"Bhadra" 1824-1834

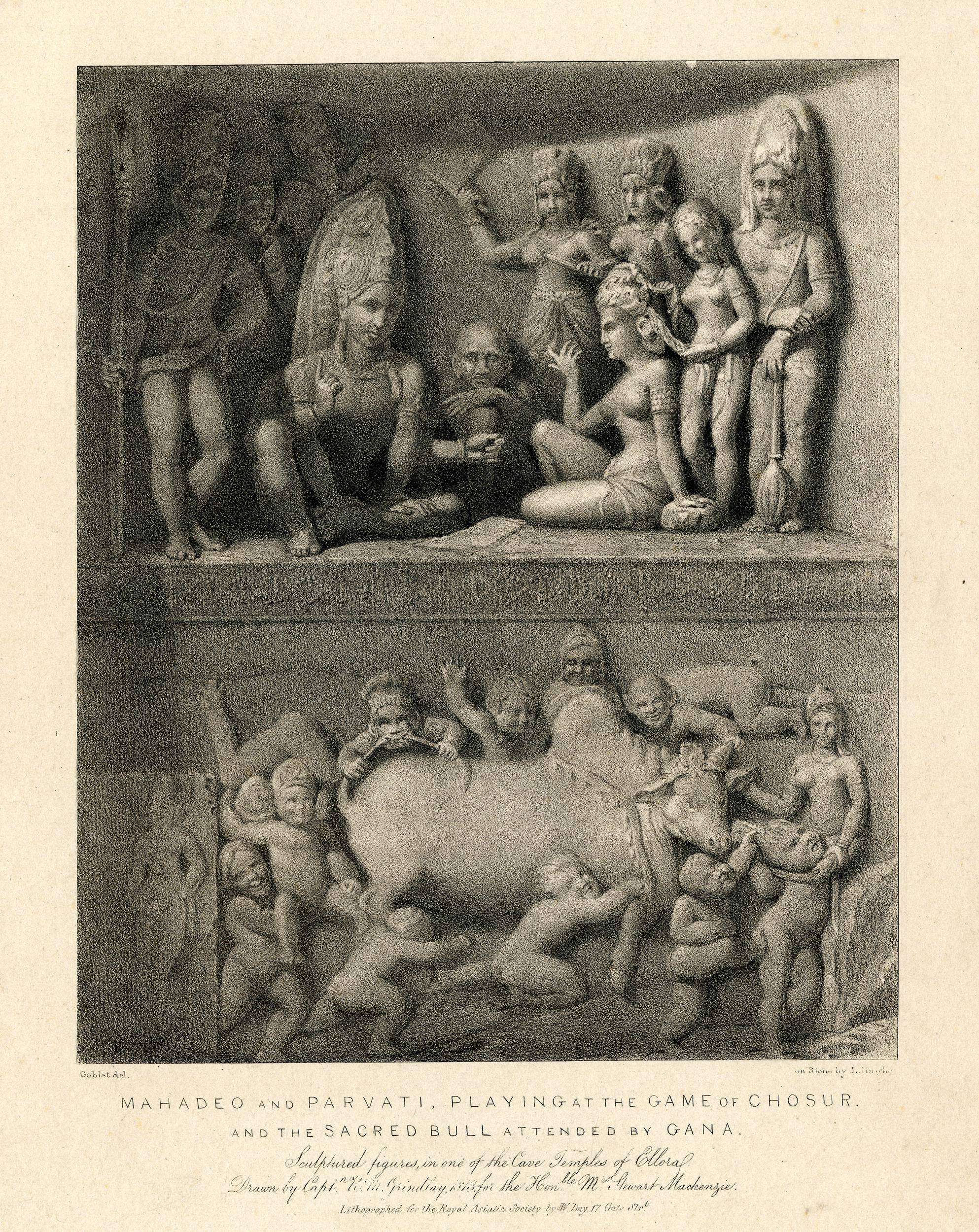
"Mahadeo and Parvati" 1824-1834

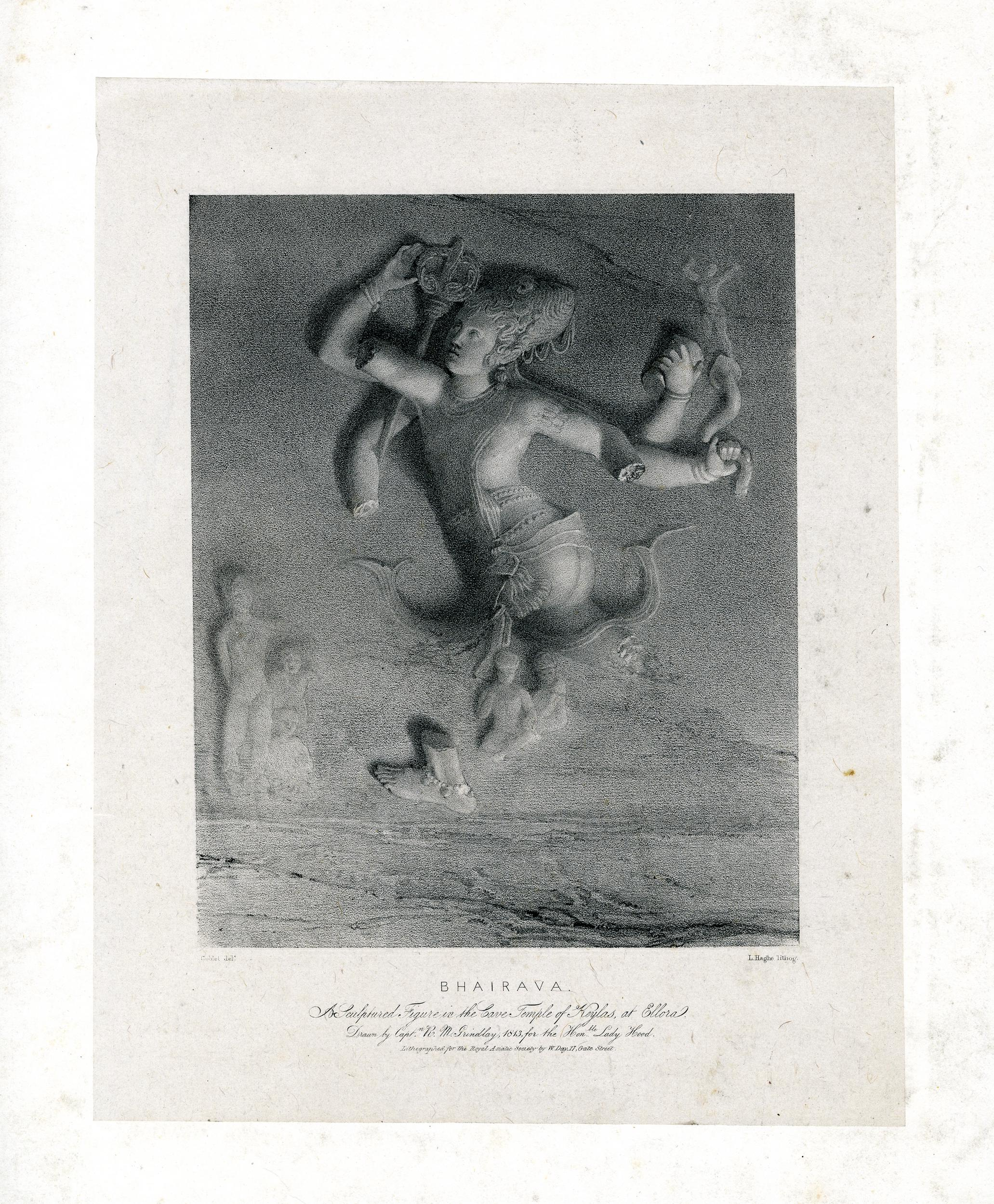
"Bhairava" 1824-1834

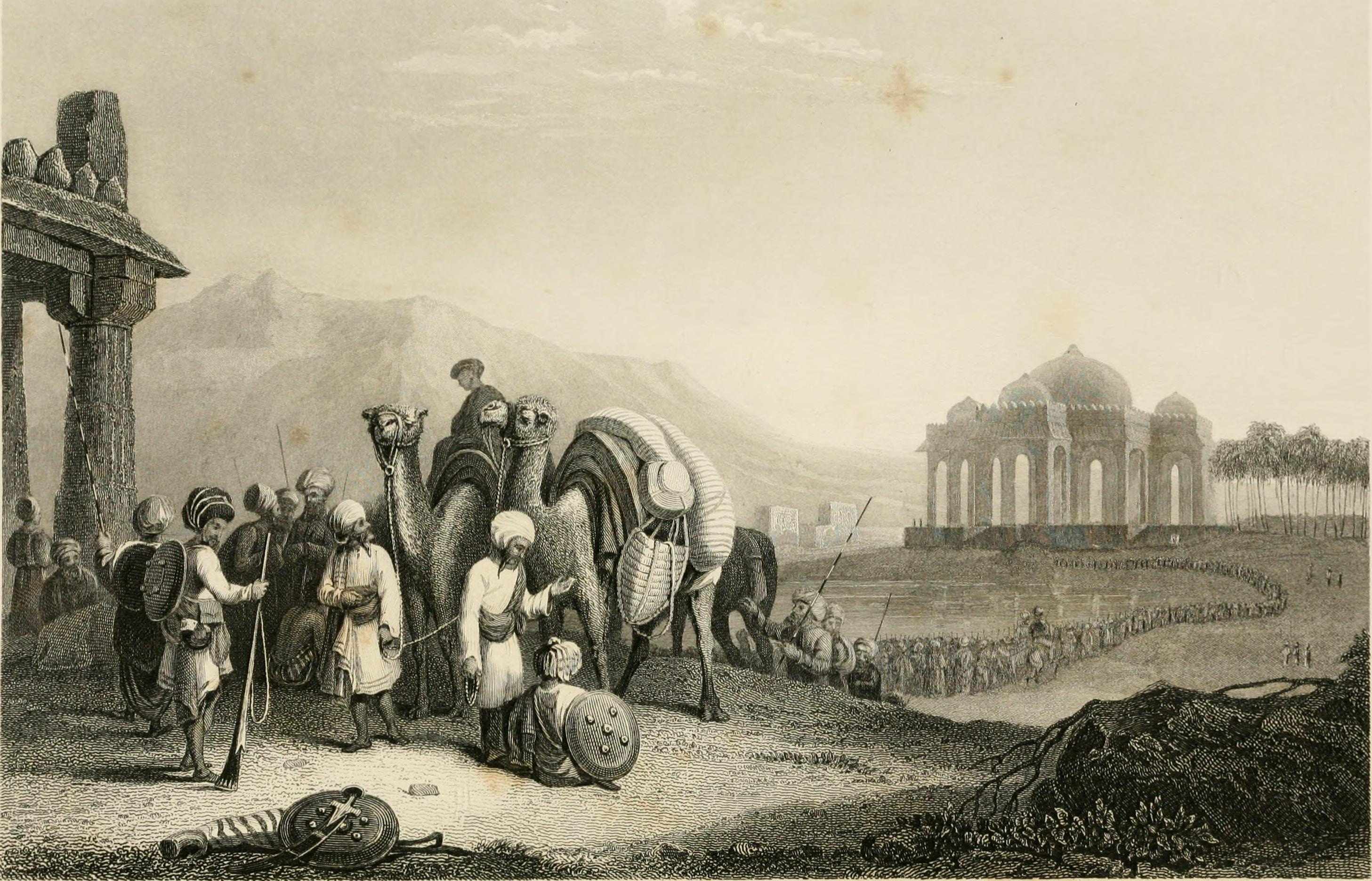
"Scene in Kathiawar. Travellers & Escort" 1858

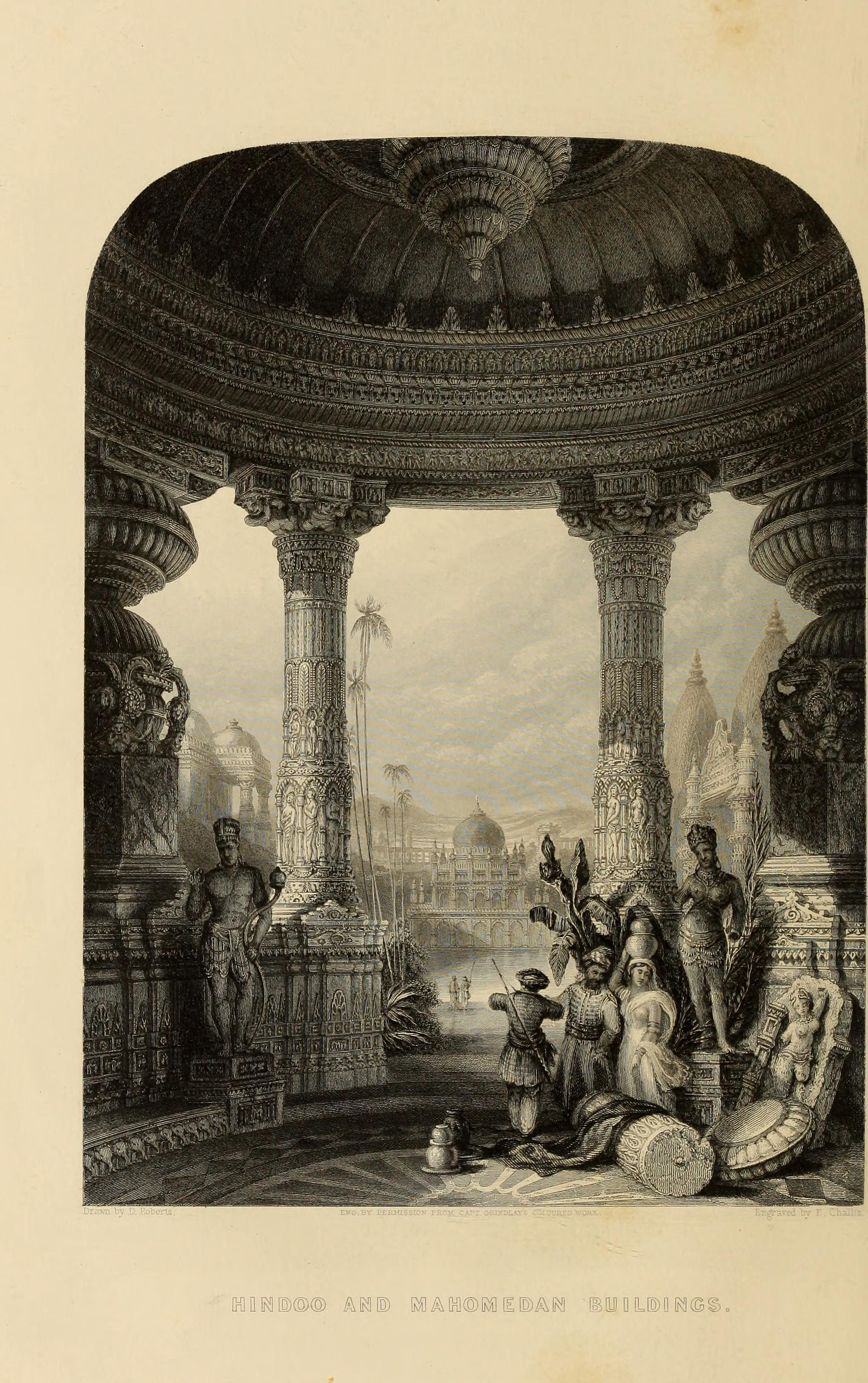
"Hindoo and Mahomedan Buildings" 1858

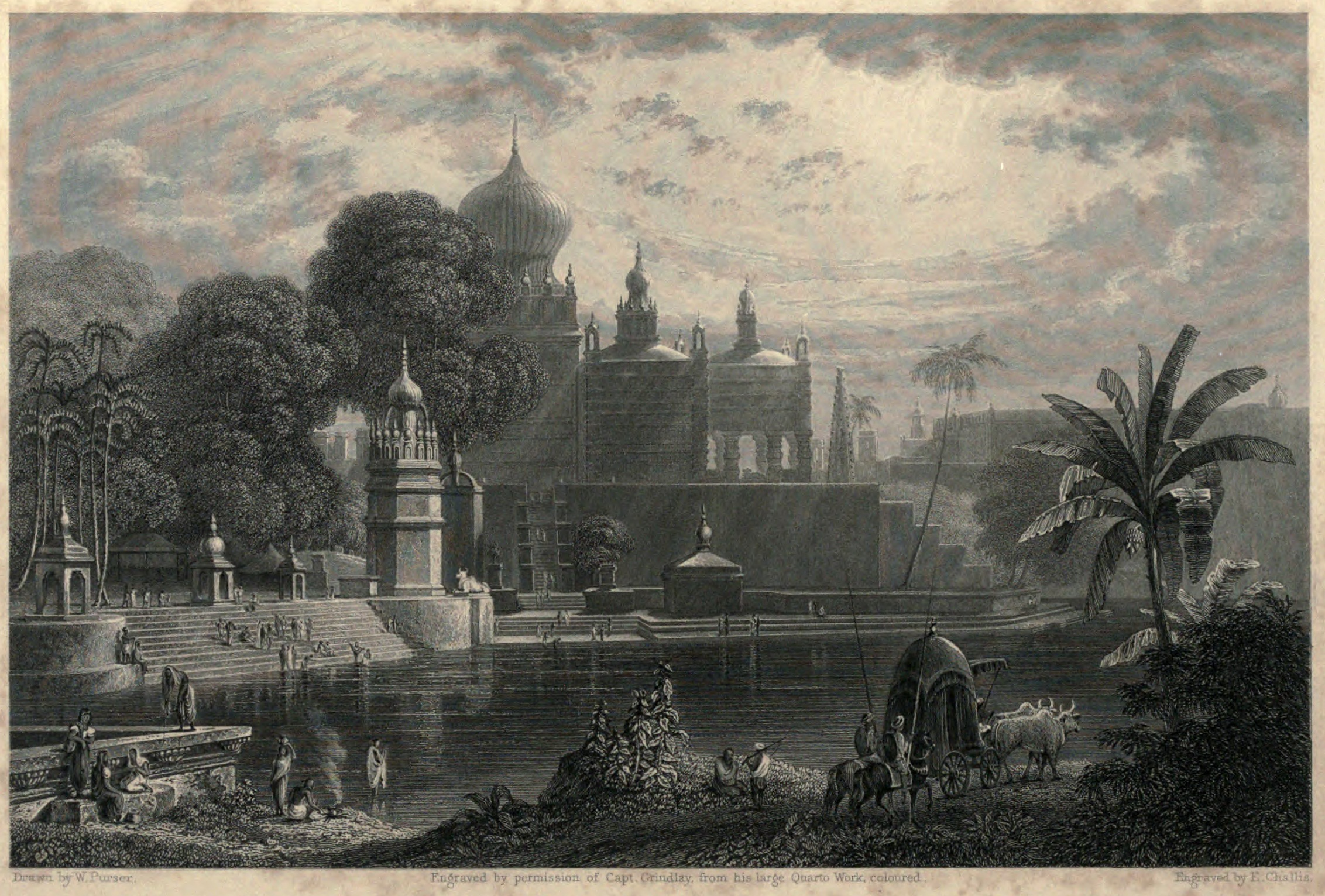
"View of Sassoor, in the Deccan" 1813

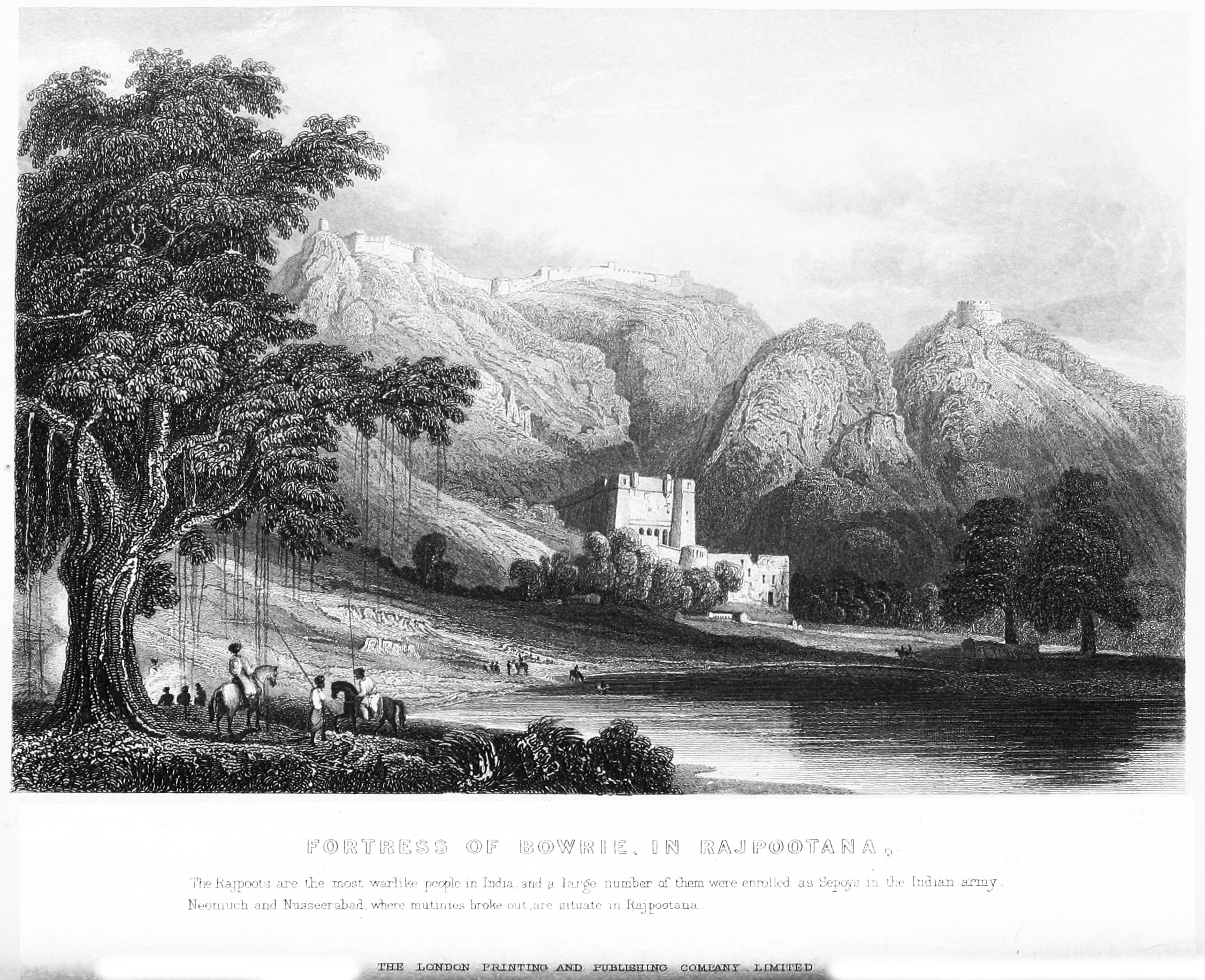
"Fortress of Bowrie in Rajpootana" 1858

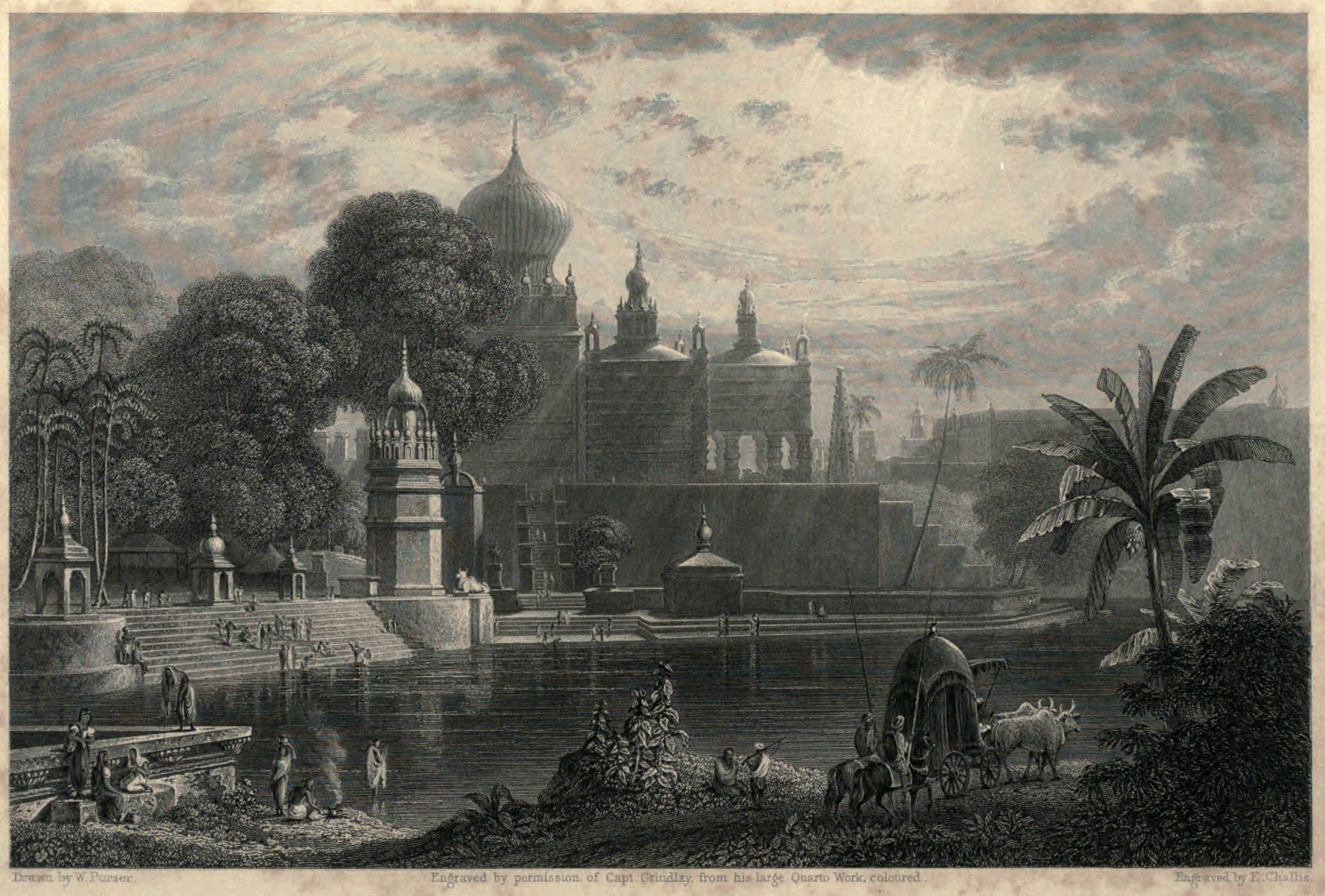
"View of Sassoor, in the Deccan" 1838

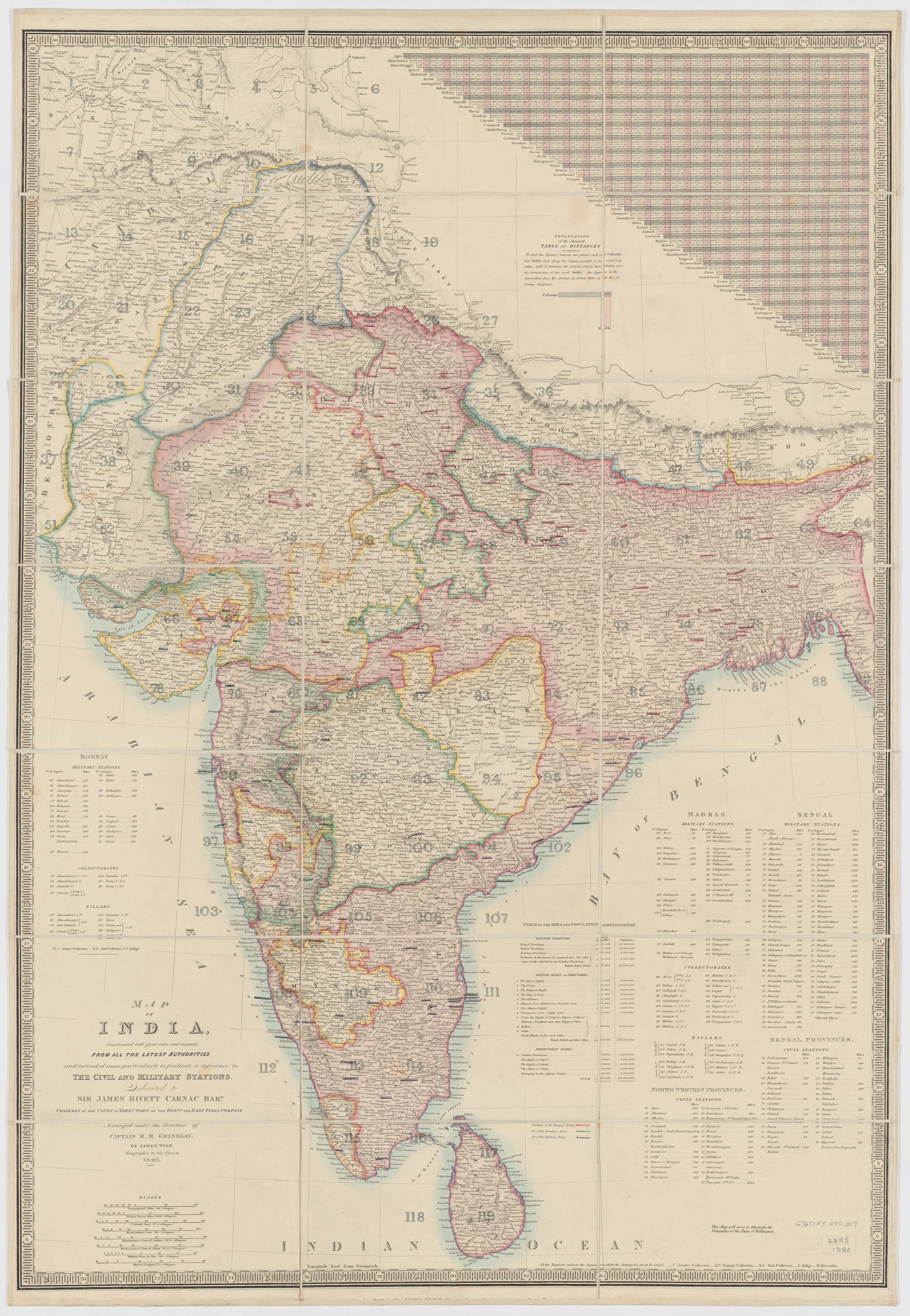
"Map of India" 1840

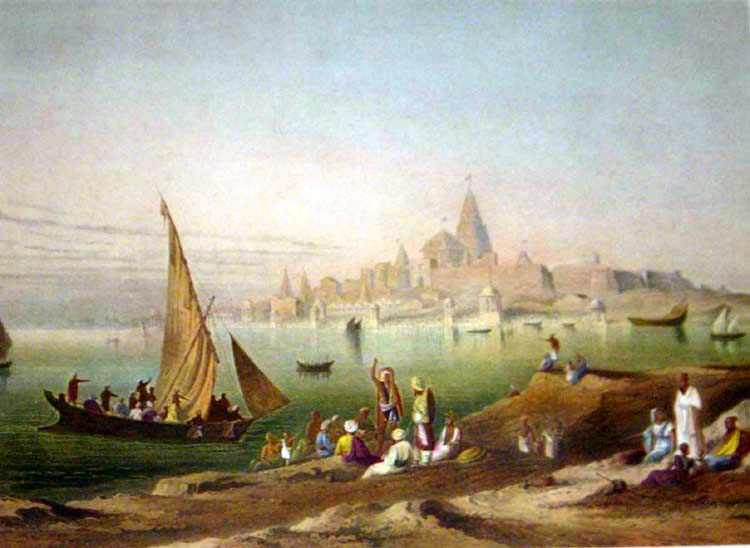
"The sacred town and temples of Dwarka" 1826-1830

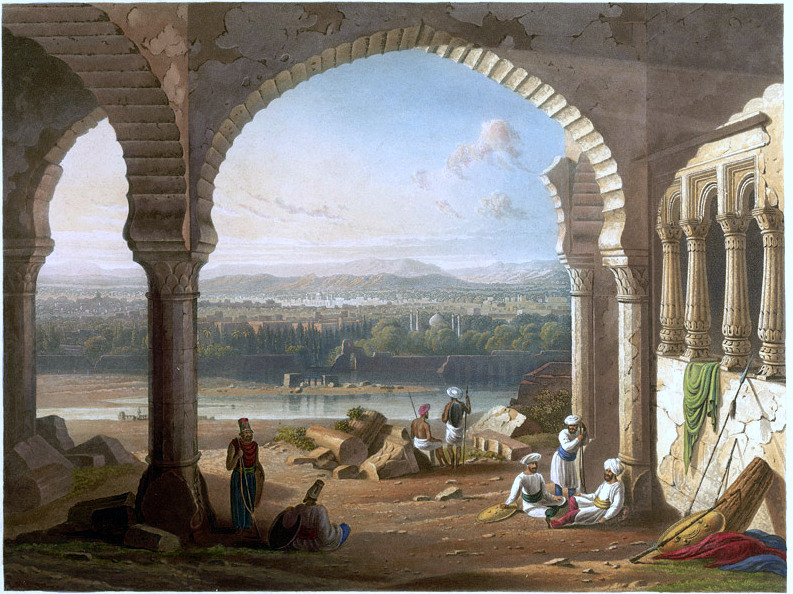
"Aurangzebs Palace" 1830

== See also ==
- Grindlay (Grindley (disambiguation))
- Grindlays Bank
- Grindlay family
- List of banking families

== Footnotes ==
^aThe full list of post-nominal letters for Robert Melville Grindlay used during his lifetime is as follows:
1. FRSA – Fellow of the Royal Society of Arts
2. MRAS – Member of the Royal Asiatic Society of Great Britain and Ireland
3. FZS – Fellow of the Zoological Society of London
4. FRHS – Fellow of the Royal Horticultural Society
5. FRBS – Fellow of the Royal Botanical Society
6. EICS – Member of the East India Company
7. ADC – Aide-de-camp of the Governor of Bombay
^bAlthough born in Marylebone, then a village near London, his distinctive middle name pays homage to his Scottish Grindlay ancestry and links between his forebears and the small but powerful noble Melville family of Midlothian and Fife (see Robert Melville, 1st Lord Melville, Earl Melville, Clan Melville, etc.).
^cThe relations of Robert Melville Grindlay were:

- James Grindlay (died 1765)
  - Reverend Dr John Grindlay (1756–1818)
    - Alexander Grindlay (1785–1794)
    - Captain Robert Melville Grindlay (1786–1877)
      - Robert Melville Grindlay (12 September 1821 – 1821), died in infancy
    - John Whyte Grindlay (1790–1790), died in infancy
    - William Grindlay (b. 3 March 1791)
    - Charles George Grindlay (14 July 1793 – 26 August 1824)
      - Lieutenant Colonel Henry Robert Grindlay (born 1821)
        - Florence Melville Grindlay
        - Walter Grindlay
        - Robert Stoneleigh Grindlay
        - Harry Carter Grindlay
        - Guy Grindlay
    - Caroline Grindlay
    - Anna Maria Melville Imbert (née Grindlay) (1798 – 5 June 1889)
    - Samuel Grindlay (8 May 1803 – 1806)
  - Alexander Grindlay

Notable extended relations include:

- Sir John Edmund Commerell, Admiral of the Fleet (nephew-in-law)
- William Augustus Commerell, first-class cricketer (nephew-in-law)

^dGrindlay and his siblings were predominately baptised at either St Marylebone Parish Church or the Church of St. Mary-at-Lambeth.
^eFredrick William Commerell, grandfather of Maria, moved to England from Germany in 1732, and was naturalised by Letters Patent in 1752.
