= Charles Withers =

Charles Withers may refer to:

- Charles W. J. Withers (born 1954), Scottish historical geographer
- Charlie Withers (1922–2005), English footballer
- Charles D. Withers (born 1916), American diplomat, U.S. Ambassador to Rwanda, 1963–1966
- Charles Withers, Surveyor General of Woods, Forests, Parks, and Chases, 1720–1736
