= Charles W. J. Withers =

Scottish linguist and geographer

Charles William John Withers, FBA, FRSE, FAcSS, FRSGS (born 6 December 1954) is a British historical geographer and academic. He has been the Geographer Royal for Scotland since 2015, and held the Ogilvie Chair of Geography at the University of Edinburgh from 1994 to 2019.

== Early life and education ==
Withers was born on 6 December 1954. He was educated at Daniel Stewart's College, an all-boys private school in Edinburgh. He studied at the University of St Andrews (BSc), and Downing College, Cambridge (PhD).

== Academic career ==
Withers joined the University of Edinburgh as Professor of Historical Geography in 1994. He was Head of its Institute of Geography from 2006 to 2009, and held the Ogilvie Chair of Geography from 2010 to 2019.

In September 2015, Withers was appointed Geographer Royal for Scotland: the first such appointment since 1897.

=== Professional affiliations ===
- Fellow of the British Academy
- Fellow of the Royal Geographical Society
- Fellow of the Royal Historical Society
- Fellow of the Royal Society of Arts
- Fellow of the Royal Society of Edinburgh
- Member of the Academia Europaea
- Chartered Geographer
- Member of the Academy of Learned Societies for the Social Sciences

== Books ==
- Placing the Enlightenment: thinking geographically about the Age of Reason (University of Chicago Press, 2007).
- Geography and revolution, edited with David N. Livingstone (University of Chicago Press, 2005).
- Georgian geographies: essays on space, place and landscape in the eighteenth century, edited with Miles Ogborn (Manchester University Press, 2004).
- Science and medicine in the Scottish Enlightenment, edited with Paul Wood (Tuckwell Press, 2002).
- Geography, science and national identity: Scotland since 1520 (Cambridge University Press, 2001).
- Geography and Enlightenment edited with David N. Livingstone (University of Chicago Press, 1999).
- Urban Highlanders: Highland-Lowland migration and urban Gaelic culture, 1700-1900 (Tuckwell Press, 1998).
- Urbanising Britain: essays on class and community in nineteenth-century Britain, edited with Gerry Kearns (Cambridge University Press, 1991).
- Discovering the Cotswolds (John Donald, 1990).
- Gaelic Scotland: the transformation of a culture region (Routledge, 1988).
- The Highland Communities of Dundee and Perth 1797-1891: a study in the social history of migrant Highlanders (Abertay Historical Society Publication, 1986).
- Gaelic in Scotland 1698 to 1891: the geographical history of a language (John Donald, 1984).
