= Thomas Brumby Johnston =

Scottish geographer, cartographer, antiquary and pioneer photographer

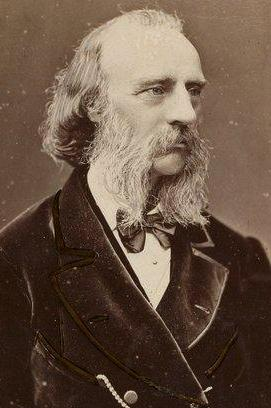
Thomas Brumby Johnston

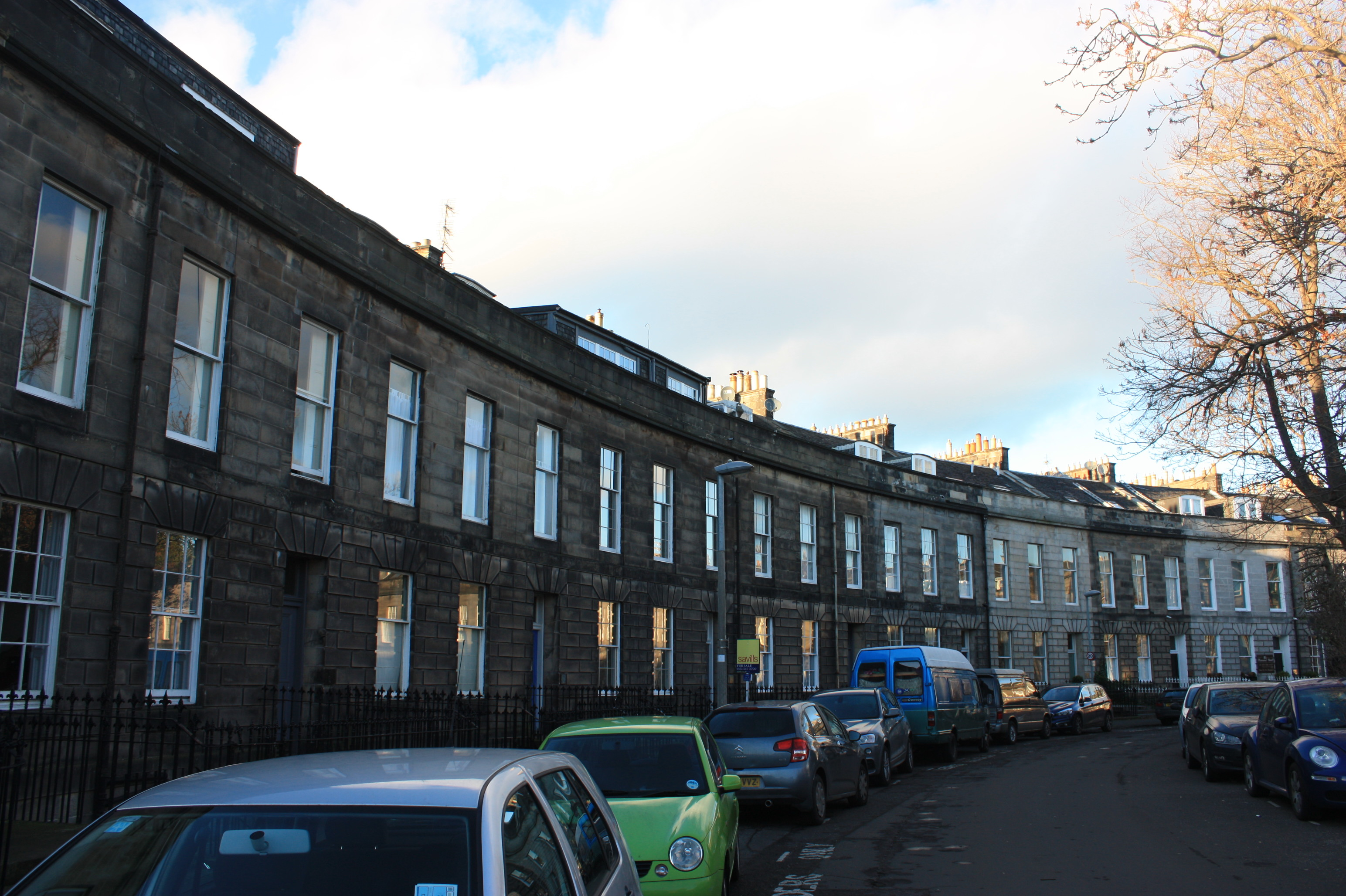
Claremont Crescent, Edinburgh

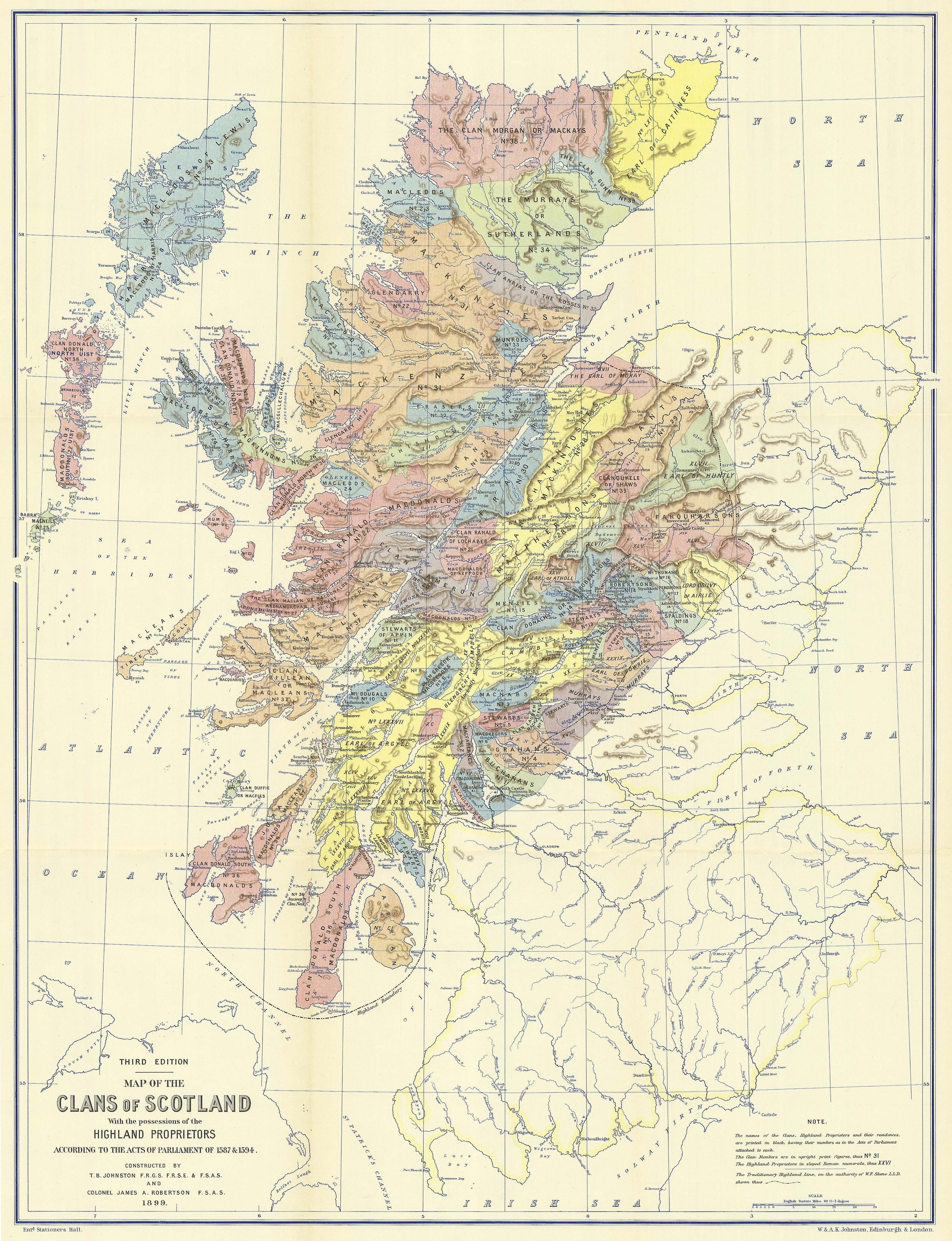
Map of the clans of Scotland (1899, third edition) by T B Johnston

Thomas Brumby Johnston FRSE FRGS FSA (1814-1897) was a 19th-century Scottish geographer, cartographer, antiquary and pioneer photographer. In later life he served as the official Geographer to Queen Victoria.

== Life ==
Johnston was born in Perth on 28 January 1814, the son of Alexander Johnston and his wife Isabel Keith. His older brother was Alexander Keith Johnston and in later life he went into partnership with him in printing atlases.

In 1856 he was a founding member of the Photographic Society of Scotland and served as the society's secretary 1862 to 1865. He exhibited at least 14 photographs to the society on a mix of collodion and waxed paper prints. Subject matter ranged from James Hogg’s wife to Kinghorn harbour and Doune Castle.

In 1867 he was elected a Fellow of the Royal Society of Edinburgh, his proposer being Sir David Brewster.

He spent his later life at 9 Claremont Crescent on the eastern fringe of Edinburgh's Second New Town.

He died on 2 September 1897.

== Family ==
In 1843 he married Jane Ruddiman. Their daughter was Margaret Isabella Johnston.
