= Ogilvie Professor of Human Geography =

Professorship at the University of Edinburgh

The Ogilvie Professor of Human Geography is the title of the occupant of the Ogilvie Chair of Geography at the University of Edinburgh. It is named in honour of Alan Grant Ogilvie FRSE (1887–1954), the first professor (1931) of their Department of Geography and an important figure in the early years of the Department of Geography at Edinburgh, who had died in office.

== List of Ogilvie Professors ==
- 1966–1986 John Terence Coppock
- 1990–2004 Susan J. Smith
- 2004–2010 Lynn A. Staeheli
- 2010–2019 Charles Withers
- 2019–present Tim Cresswell

== See also ==
- List of professorships at the University of Edinburgh
