= John Terence Coppock =

British geographer

John Terry Coppock CBE FBA FRSE (2 June 1921 – 28 June 2000) was a British geographer who was the Ogilvie Professor of Human Geography at University of Edinburgh from 1966 to 1986 and Secretary and Treasurer of the Carnegie Trust for the Universities of Scotland from 1986 to 2000. He was a pioneer in three areas of scholarship – agricultural geography, land-use management and computer applications.

== Early life and war years ==
Coppock was born in Crieff in Perthshire the son of Arthur Coppock and Valerie Margaret Phillips.

The family moved to Wales and he was educated at Penarth County School. He left school at 17 in 1938 and became a civil servant in the Lord Chancellor's Department. Shortly afterwards he joined a territorial battalion of the Welsh Regiment, went to camp in August 1939, and did not return to civil life for over seven years. He spent the first two and a half years of military service in various parts of the UK including Scotland and Northern Ireland, and the next four and a half in various parts of the Middle East which he reached via Cape Town and Aden. He returned to the Civil Service in 1946 and rapidly became in turn an executive officer in the Ministry of Works and an officer of Customs and Excise (his pre-War ambition). A year later, in 1949, he left to accept a place at Queens' College, Cambridge, where within two years he was awarded first class in both Parts I and II of the Geographical Tripos.

== Career and later life ==
After a year as a research student in Cambridge, reading widely and continuing his practice of sampling senior undergraduate courses in other disciplines, he was appointed to the staff of the Geography Department of University College London, where he remained for fifteen years, as Assistant Lecturer (1950–52), Lecturer (1952–64) and Reader (1964–65). In 1963-64 he also spent a year as visiting senior lecturer in the Department of Geography in the University of Ibadan in Nigeria.

Coppock was appointed as the first Ogilvie Professor of Geography at the University of Edinburgh in 1965. This professorship is named after Alan G. Ogilvie, a figure who was key to setting up the department. Coppock taught a range of courses in economic geography, rural planning, agricultural geography and the regional geography of Scotland. He also initiated the MSc Course in Geographical Information Systems, the first of its kind in the world. During which time he worked closely with the government advising them on issues of agriculture, tourism, census data and Scottish affairs - introducing a variety of cartography and geographic information systems. Through the International Geographical Union, he also advised the Canadian government.

Retirement from the Ogilvie Chair in 1986 was followed immediately by his appointment as Secretary and Treasurer of the Carnegie Trust for the Universities of Scotland, serving until his death in 2000. He also became Chairman of the Scottish Field Studies Council and played a major role in raising half a million pounds for a major development at the field centre at Kindrogan House in Perthshire which was appropriately named the Coppock Building in May 1995 when opened by The Princess Royal.

He died in Edinburgh on 28 June 2000.

== Family ==
Coppock married Sheila Mary Burnett in 1953. She died in 1990.

== Awards and honorary positions ==
- He was elected FBA in 1975, only the second British Geographer to be so honoured (after Henry Clifford Darby), and was a Vice-President of the British Academy from 1985 to 1987.
- Elected FRSE in 1976 and served on Council from 1979 to 1982.
- Awarded the 1985 Victoria Medal from the Royal Geographical Society.
- President of the Institute of British Geographers
- Honorary Fellowship of the Royal Scottish Geographical Society
- CBE in 1987 for services to geography.
- Honorary degrees from the Universities of Edinburgh and Glasgow in 1999.

== Principal publications ==
- Recreation in the countryside: a spatial analysis, 1975
- An agricultural geography of Great Britain, 1971
- An agricultural atlas of England and Wales, 1964
- Greater London, 1964 (as editor, with Hugh C Prince)
- Information technology and scholarship: applications in the humanities and social sciences, 1999
