= David N. Livingstone =

Geography professor (born 1953)

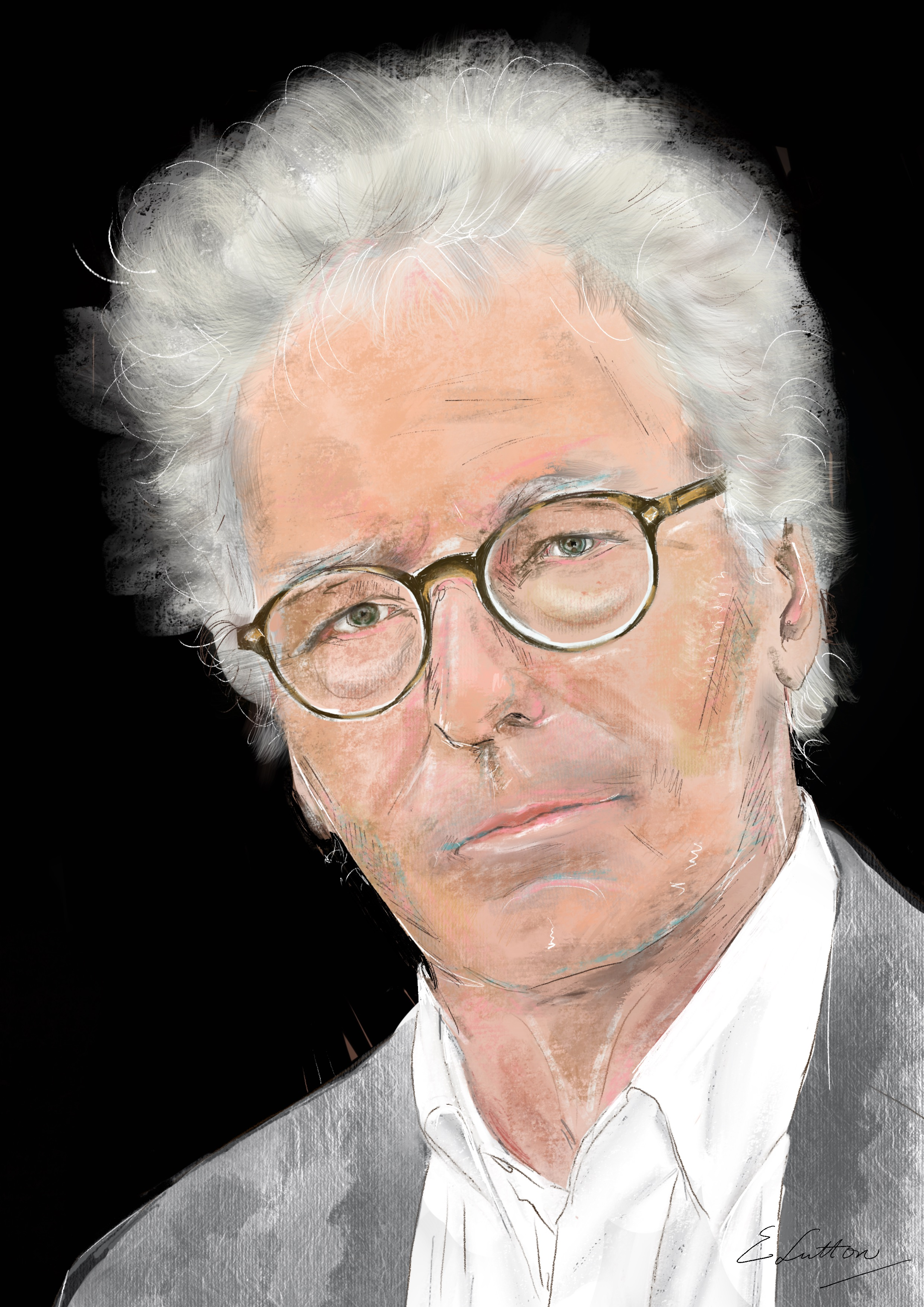
Portrait of David N. Livingstone by Emma Lutton

David Noel Livingstone CBE OBE MRIA FBA FAcSS MAE (born 15 March 1953) is a Northern Ireland-born geographer, historian, and academic. He is Professor of Geography and Intellectual History at Queen's University Belfast.

== Personal background ==
David Livingstone was born in Northern Ireland, and educated at Banbridge Academy and Queen's University Belfast (B.A., Ph.D.). Following graduation, he continued at Queen's as a Research Officer and Lecturer, becoming Reader and then full Professor. He has held visiting professorships at Calvin College, Michigan, University of British Columbia, University of Notre Dame, and Baylor University. He is married to Frances Livingstone, has two children (Justin and Emma), and lives in Belfast. He was appointed an OBE for his services to Geography and History, and CBE for services to scholarship in Geography, History of Science and Intellectual History.

== Books ==
- Darwin's Forgotten Defenders: The Encounter Between Evangelical Theology and Evolutionary Thought (Scottish Academic Press, 1984).
- Nathaniel Southgate Shaler and the Culture of American Science (University of Alabama Press, 1987).
- The Geographical Tradition: Episodes in the History of a Contested Enterprise (Blackwell, 1992)
- The Preadamite Theory and the Marriage of Science and Religion (American Philosophical Society, 1992)
- Human Geography: An Essential Anthology, joint editor with John A. Agnew and Alistair Rodgers (Blackwell, 1996)
- Evangelicals and Science in Historical Perspective, edited with D. G. Hart and Mark A. Noll (Oxford University Press, 1999).
- Geography and Enlightenment, edited with Charles W. J. Withers (University of Chicago Press, 1999)
- Ulster-American Religion: Moments in the History of a Cultural Connection, with Ronald Wells (University of Notre Dame Press, 1999)
- Science, Space and Hermeneutics, The Hettner Lectures 2001 (University of Heidelberg, 2002)
- Putting Science in its Place: Geographies of Scientific Knowledge (University of Chicago Press, 2003)
- Geography and Revolution, joint editor with Charles W. J. Withers (University of Chicago Press, 2005)
- Adam's Ancestors: Race, Religion & the Politics of Human Origins (The Johns Hopkins University Press, 2008)
- Dealing with Darwin: Place, Politics, and Rhetoric in Religious Engagements with Evolution (Baltimore: Johns Hopkins University Press 2014)

== Awards ==
- Fellow of the British Academy (FBA)
- Member of the Royal Irish Academy (MRIA)
- 1997: Back Award, Royal Geographical Society
- 1998: Centenary Medal, Royal Scottish Geographical Society
- British Academy Research Reader
- Member of the Academia Europaea (MAE)
- Fellow of the Royal Society of Arts (FRSA)
- Fellow of the Academy of Social Sciences (FAcSS)
- OBE for services to Geography and History
- 2008: Gold Medal, Royal Irish Academy
- Corresponding Member, International Academy of the History of Science
- 2011: Founder's Medal, Royal Geographical Society
- 2013: Hon.D.Litt, University of Aberdeen
- 2019: CBE for services to scholarship

== Professional distinctions ==
- President of the Geography Section of the British Association for the Advancement of Science for 2004–05.
- Vice President (for Research) and Member of Council, Royal Geographical Society, 2007–.
- Charles Lyell Lecturer, British Association for the Advancement of Science, 1994–95.
- Hettner Lectures, University of Heidelberg, 2001.
- Murrin Lectures, University of British Columbia, 2002.
- Progress in Human Geography Lecture, Royal Geographical Society, 2005.
- Appleton Lecture, University of Hull, 2007
- Von Humboldt Lecture, U.C.L.A., 2007
- Gordon Manley Lecture, Royal Holloway, University of London, 2007
- Gunning Lecture, University of Edinburgh, 2009
- Gregory Lecture, University of Southampton, 2010
- Gifford Lectures, University of Aberdeen, 2014
- Dudleian Lecture, Harvard University, 2015
