= Alexander Keith Johnston (1804–1871) =

Scottish geographer and cartographer (died 1871)

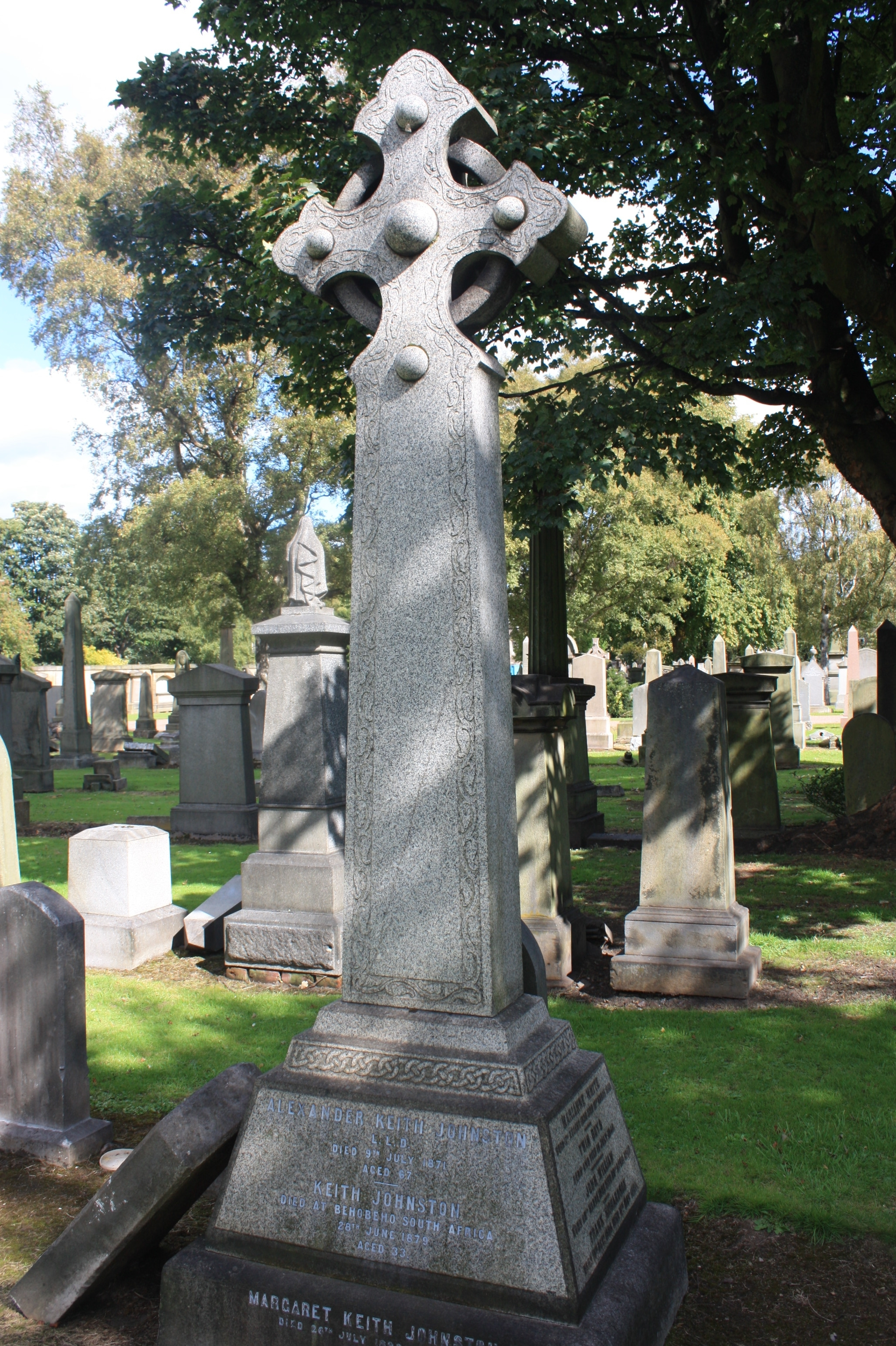
Grave of Alexander Keith Johnston, Grange Cemetery

Alexander Keith Johnston FRSE FRGS FGS FEGS LLD (died 9 July 1871) was a Scottish geographer and cartographer.

== Biography ==
He was born at Kirkhill near Penicuik, south of Edinburgh. He was the son of Andrew Johnston and Isabel Keith. His brother was Thomas Brumby Johnston FRSE.

After an education at the High School and the University of Edinburgh he was apprenticed to the Edinburgh engraver and mapmaker, James Kirkwood and William Home Lizars. In 1826, he joined his brother William (who would become Sir William Johnston, Lord Provost of Edinburgh) in a printing and engraving business, forming the well-known cartographical firm of W. and A. K. Johnston with offices based at 4 St Andrew Square in Edinburgh's New Town (demolished 2016) and their printworks based at Edina Works, off Easter Road. The firm used the clan motto of "Ready Aye Ready" as their logo. Early hikes in the West Highlands had led Johnston to despair at the accuracy of maps, and inspired a desire to rectify this.

The rest of Johnston's life was devoted to geography, his later years to its educational aspects especially. His services were recognised by the leading scientific societies of Europe and America.

Following his publication of The National Atlas of Historical, Commercial and Political Geography in 1843, Johnston was appointed Geographer Royal.

In October 1849, he was elected a Fellow of the Royal Society of Edinburgh, his proposer being Robert Chambers. In 1862 he was a founding member of the Meteorological Society of Scotland. He was awarded an honorary doctorate (LLD) in 1865.

His Edinburgh address in later years was 16 Grosvenor Crescent in the affluent West End.

He died at Ben Rhydding, Yorkshire, in 1871. He is buried in the north-west section of Grange Cemetery in Edinburgh facing the west path.

== Works ==
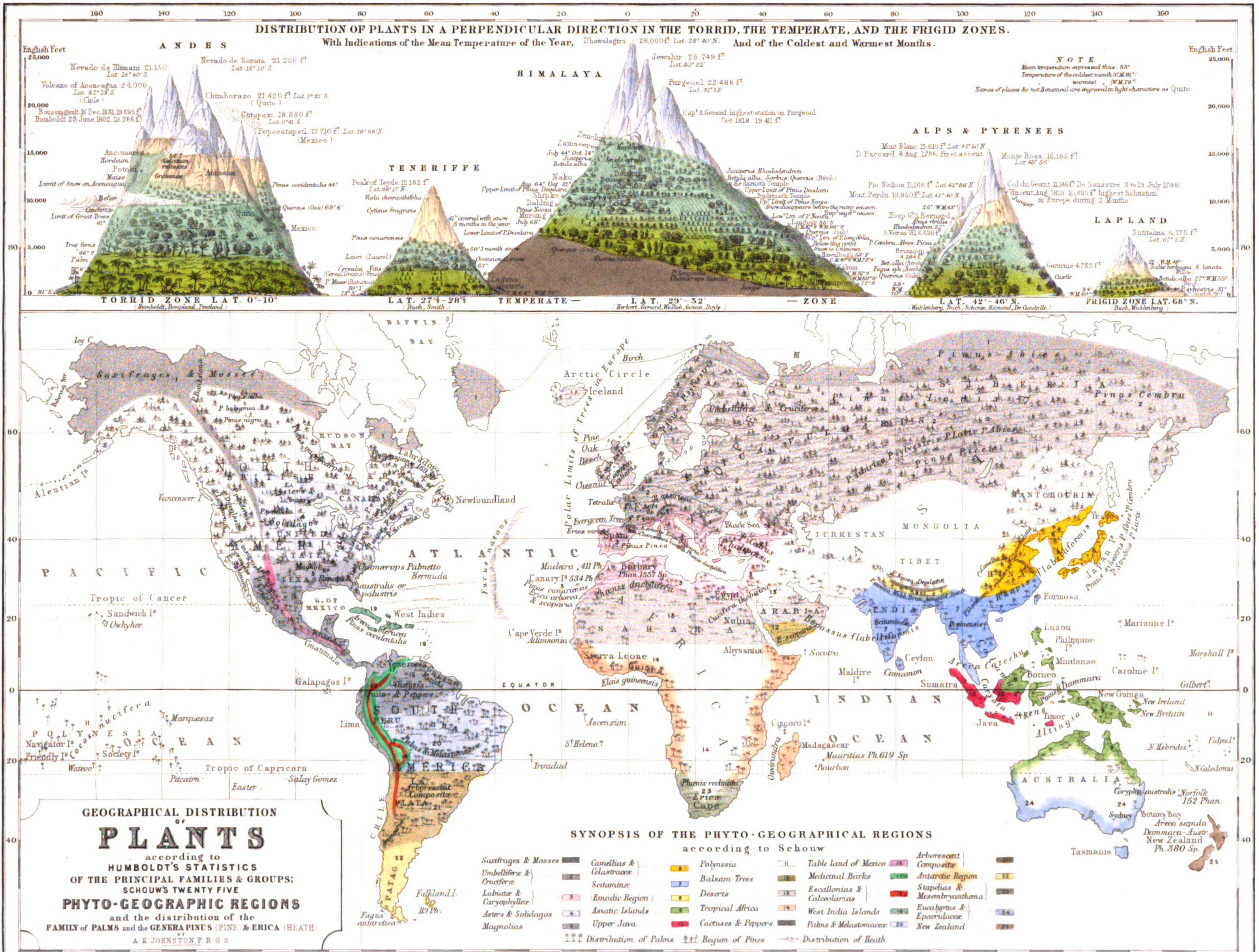
Geographical Distribution of Plants and Distribution of Plants in a Perpendicular Direction in the Torrid, the Temperate, and the Rigid Zones, first published 1848 by Johnston in The Physical Atlas

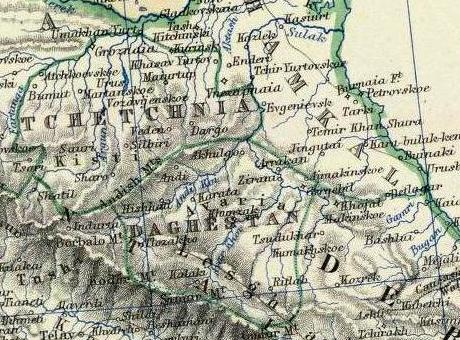
Johnston, Alexander Keith: Turkey in Asia, Transcaucasia. 1861

Johnston combined cartography with a painstaking and scholarly approach to map production. He went on to establish a reputation for scope and accuracy. Thematic atlases became the hallmark of the company he had founded and W & A K Johnston were appointed engravers to King William IV in 1834. In 1835, he constructed the first English language physical globe of the world incorporating its geology, hydrography and meteorology.

In 1843, Johnston published The National Atlas of Historical, Commercial and Political Geography. Johnston was the first to bring the study of physical geography into competent notice in Britain. His attention had been called to the subject by Alexander von Humboldt. In 1848, Johnston published Physical Atlas of Natural Phenomena, followed by a second and enlarged edition in 1856. The atlas contained maps and descriptive letterpress to illustrate the geology, hydrography, meteorology, botany, zoology, and ethnology of the globe. The Physical Atlas was partly based on Heinrich Berghaus's German language Physikalischer Atlas and reflected the increased interest in the mapping of zoological and biological distributions. 18th century thinkers such as Montesquieu had stressed the importance of geography and climate as determining factors in history, and the concept of natural frontiers. The atlas was a visual representation of Humboldtian science, which became popular in the 19th century and was preoccupied with the measurement of environmental parameters on a global scale. Berghaus and Johnston effectively illustrated the text of Humboldt's Kosmos and both atlases were subsequently plagiarized and abridged for school editions.

Johnston published a Dictionary of Geography in 1850, with many later editions. The Royal Atlas of Modern Geography was first published in 1855 and served as an atlas of military geography to accompany Alison's History of Europe published in 1848. A variety of other atlases and maps for educational or scientific purposes. In 1856, Johnston published the "School Atlas of Astronomy".

In 1861, Johnston published the first edition of the Royal Atlas of Modern Geography with 48 maps. By 1914, the atlas had gone through 12 editions and morphed into the Johnston's Handy Royal Atlas of Modern Geography with 61 colour lithographed maps and an index of 84 pages. While the Bartholomew's Citizen's Atlas sold more copies, being half the price, the Royal Altlas became the standard library atlas throughout the British Empire.

In 1867, Johnston produced a new edition of his School Atlas of Classical Geography. It contained a series of new maps that reflected the results of the most recent research into the classical antiquity. The Map of the Outer Geography of the Odyssey and two maps of ancient Greece were based on the scholarly work of William Ewart Gladstone, who had also revised the map plates and text of the atlas.

In 1871, Johnston published the Half-Crown Atlas of British History for the price sensitive educational market. It was designed as a connected series of maps for teachers and students and illustrated leading events of history.

== Family ==
He married Margaret Gray in 1837. She was thereafter known as Margaret Keith Johnston.

His eldest son, also named Alexander Keith Johnston (1844–1879), was also the author of various geographical works and papers.
