= Kommerell =

Kommerell or Commerell is a German surname. Notable people with the surname include:

- Blanche Kommerell (born 1950), German actress and writer
- Max Kommerell (1902–1944), German literary historian, writer, and poet
- John Edmund Commerell (1829–1901), Royal Navy officer and Conservative politician
- William Commerell (1822–1858), English cricketer
