= Royal Botanic Society =

Former learned society in London

Coordinates: 51°31′39.33″N 0°9′13.17″W

- Successor: Queen Mary's Gardens
- Formation: 1839
- Founder: James de Carle Sowerby
- Founded at: London
- Dissolved: 1932
- Headquarters: Regent's Park London

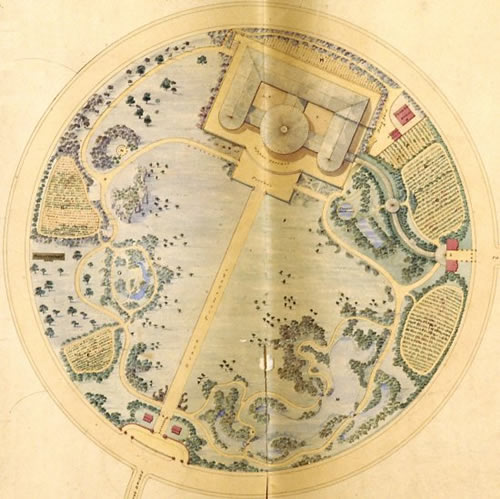
A design for the Royal Botanic Society Gardens in Regent's Park, London by Decimus Burton, 1840.

The Royal Botanic Society was a learned society founded in 1839 by James de Carle Sowerby under a royal charter. Its purpose was to promote "botany in all its branches, and its applications." The society was based at leased grounds within the Inner Circle in Regent's Park, London, where they created an experimental garden with large palm-houses and a water-lily house. The gardens were open to members and at times the public, and hosted a variety of entertainments, including flower shows. The society was dissolved in 1932 after failing to renew the lease. The society's library is held by the Natural History Museum in London. The site became Queen Mary's Gardens.

== History ==
The Royal Botanic Society was founded in 1839 by James de Carle Sowerby under a royal charter to the Duke of Norfolk and others. The patron was Queen Victoria. Its purpose was to promote "botany in all its branches, and its applications." Soon after it was established, it leased the grounds within the Inner Circle in Regent's Park, London, about 18 acres (7.3 ha), for use as an experimental garden. Sowerby remained as secretary for some 30 years, and J. B. Sowerby and W. Sowerby later also served as secretaries. The garden was open to members and their guests and also to the general public for a fee on certain days of the week. It included large palm-houses and a water-lily house. In the summer, flowershows, fetes, and other entertainments were held there.

The society had a number of publications, including the Quarterly Record of the Royal Botanic Society of London (1880-1909), Botanical Journal (1910-1918) and Quarterly Summary and Meteorological Readings, Royal Botanic Society of London (1919–1930).

In 1932 it failed to secure a renewal of the lease, and the society was dissolved. Its surviving records were deposited in the St. Marylebone Public Library. The society had a library which is now held by the Natural History Museum.

The site became Queen Mary's Gardens, which is run by the Royal Parks Agency, and is fully open to the general public without charge as part of Regent's Park.

Fellows of the society used the post-nominal letters F.R.B.S.
