= Miles Ogborn =

Miles Ogborn is a human geographer at Queen Mary, University of London.

== Honors ==
In 2012 Ogborn was elected as a Fellow of the British Academy. In 2009, Professor Miles Ogborn was selected as a Distinguished Historical Geographer by the Historical Geography Specialty Group of the AAG. With this award, he was also given the opportunity to give a lecture at the Las Vegas AAG which was published in the journal Historical Geography. He was awarded the Philip Leverhulme Prize in 2001 for outstanding contribution to his discipline.

== Works ==
Miles Ogborn has the following research and works:

- Spaces of Modernity (1998)
- Indian Ink (2007)
- Father of Eef (2007)
- Global Lives (2008)
- The Freedom of Speech (2019)

== See also ==
- Lampeter Geography School
