= Geographer Royal =

Scottish honorific appointment

Geographer Royal is a Scottish honorific appointment. The holder of the position originally was intended to give geographic and mapping advice to the sovereign. In 1682, Charles II appointed the first Geographer Royal, Robert Sibbald.

A further three Geographer Royal appointments were made during the 18th and 19th centuries. These included Alexander Keith Johnston a Scottish geographer and cartographer who was made Geographer Royal following his publication of The National Atlas of Historical, Commercial and Political Geography in 1843. In 1897, Queen Victoria appointed George Harvey Johnston, an Edinburgh cartographer and publisher to the position. Upon his death, the position remained for vacant for 118 years until in 2015, Professor Charles Withers was appointed to the post. He was succeeded in April 2022 by Professor Jo Sharp.
