= William Commerell =

English cricketer

Personal information
- Full name: William Augustus Commerell
- Born: 1 October 1822; Marylebone, London, England
- Died: 19 November 1858 (aged 36); Westminster, London, England
- Batting: Unknown
- Bowling: Unknown

Domestic team information
- Years: Team
- 1843: Oxford University
- 1846: Marylebone Cricket Club

Career statistics
Competition	First-class
Matches	5
Runs scored	72
Batting average	8.00
100s/50s	–/–
Top score	21
Balls bowled	72
Wickets	3
Bowling average	10.33
5 wickets in innings	–
10 wickets in match	–
Best bowling	2/15
Catches/stumpings	–/–
- Source: Cricinfo, 21 August 2019

William Augustus Commerell (1 October 1822 – 19 November 1858) was an English first-class cricketer.

The son of John Williams Commerell and his wife, Sophia Commerell (née Bosanquet), he was born at Marylebone in October 1822. He was educated at Harrow School, before going up to Corpus Christi College, Oxford. While studying at Oxford, he made his debut in first-class cricket for Oxford University in 1843, making two appearances at Oxford against the Marylebone Cricket Club (MCC) and Cambridge University. He made further first-class appearances, in 1845 for the Gentlemen of England against the Gentlemen of Kent at Canterbury, and in 1846 for the MCC against the Surrey Club and for the Gentlemen of England against the Gentlemen of Kent. After graduating from Oxford, he became a farmer at Slinfold in Sussex and served as a magistrate at Brighton. He died at Westminster in November 1858. His brother was Sir John Edmund Commerell, the Admiral of the Fleet.
