= Alfred Robert Grindlay =

English inventor, industrialist and official (1876–1965)

His Worship Alfred Robert Grindlay CBE JP
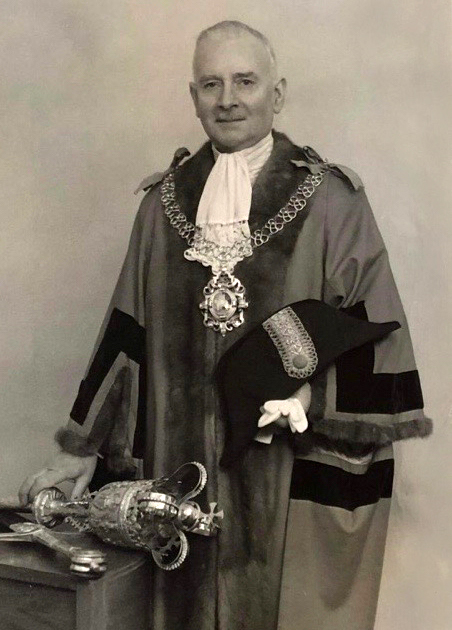
- A. R. Grindlay in the regalia of the Mayor of Coventry, 1947

Mayor of Coventry
- In office 1 January 1941 – 31 December 1941
- Monarch: George VI
- Prime Minister: Winston Churchill
- Preceded by: John Albert Moseley
- Succeeded by: Emily Smith

Alderman for Coventry City Council
- In office 1950 – 1964 (14 years)

Councillor for Coventry City Council
- In office 1924 – 1964 (40 years)
- Constituency: Greyfriars, Coventry

Magistrate (Justice of the Peace)
- In office 1932 – 1951 (19 years)
Further government positions
Chairman of Coventry Progressive Party
Chairman of City Redevelopment Committee
Chairman of Coventry Savings Committee
Chairman of Coventry Waterworks and Fire Brigade Committee
Chairman of Coventry Libraries and Museum Committee
Chairman of Coventry Hospital Carnival Committee
Member of Coventry Hospital Committee
City Engineer for Coventry
Further civic positions
Chairman of Coventry and Warwickshire Motor Club
President of Coventry and District Free Church Council
Vice-President of Coventry City Football Club
Vice-President of Coventry and North Warwickshire Cricket Club
Commandant of the Coventry Auxiliary Fire Service
Special Constable

Personal details
- Born: 1 February 1876 Coventry, Warwickshire
- Died: 14 April 1965 (aged 89) Allesley, Warwickshire
- Resting place: All Saints Church, Allesley
- Party: Conservative; Liberal
- Spouse: Emma Chaplin (m. 1896)
- Children: Reginald Robert Grindlay; Alfred Stephen Chaplin Grindlay
- Parents: William Vaughan Grindlay; Mary Ann Raby
- Occupation: Politician; Official; Industrialist; Engineer; Inventor
- Awards: Commander of the Order of the British Empire; Officer of the Order of the British Empire; Honorary Freedom of the City of Coventry
- Family: Grindlay

Alfred Robert Grindlay CBE, JP (1 February 1876 – 14 April 1965) was an English inventor, industrialist and official during the 19th and 20th centuries. He co-founded Grindlay Peerless, the motorcycle engineering company and was Mayor of Coventry during WWII and the Coventry Blitz.

== Early life and family ==
Grindlay was born in Coventry, England, in 1876, the fifth child of nine and second son of William Vaughan Grindlay (1843–1891), into a line of established engineers and horological master craftsmen. He was orphaned while still a teenager, when first his mother, Mary Ann, died in December 1890, and then his father only a year later in December 1891. Upon leaving school, Grindlay joined a local cycle firm and began learning the skills he would employ later in his career.

During his youth he was an able football player and regular midfielder for Foleshill Great Heath Football Club. He captained the side during their most successful period, including the 1898–99 season when he was one of the top goal scorers and the club won the Midland Daily Telegraph Association Football Challenge Cup, Foleshill Nursing Association Cup, and the Nuneaton Cottage Hospital Cup.

At the age of 20, Grindlay married Emma Chaplin in St Paul's Church, Coventry on 7 September 1896, and started his family in 1899, aged 23, when the first of his two sons, Reginald Robert Grindlay, was born.^{[a]}

By 1901, Grindlay was working at Riley Cycle Company, one of the major firms in Coventry at that time. He progressed steadily within the company, until 1910, when while working as a foreman at Riley Cycle Company, he applied for a patent (24,683) regarding "improved means for carrying spare wheels" for motorcars. That same year Grindlay left Riley Cycle Company and took over the Coventry Motor & Sundries business, establishing Grindlay Sidecars, which became known for its "extremely high quality" machines.

In 1918, he established Grindlay Company or Grindlay (Coventry) Ltd, which focused on coachwork for cars and later the manufacture of the Grindlay Spring-Wheel Sidecar which he himself designed.

== War effort ==
Grindlay contributed to the allied war effort both directly, through volunteer policing and emergency services civil defence work, and indirectly, by turning over his various factories for the production of war materials during WWI and WWII.

=== World War I ===
At the beginning of WWI Grindlay combined forces with Thomas Edward Musson (b.1875) founding Musson & Grindlay, specialising in sidecar production, and oversaw Musson & Grindlay and Coventry Motor & Sundries providing key materials for the armament and munitions industry in Coventry throughout the war. Some 5 years after the end of WWI, he parted ways with Musson in 1923 and established Grindlay Peerless.

During the war, Grindlay was part of the Motor Patrol section of the Special Constabulary of Coventry, where he was able to utilise his extensive motoring experience.

=== World War II ===
Throughout WWII, Grindlay was Commandant of the Coventry Auxiliary Fire Service (AFS) in charge of all associated civil fire-fighting procedures, training, and emergency response operations. He led the development of the AFS and was in charge of the service until its eventual amalgamation with the National Fire Service. Moreover, in 1941 he was elected Mayor of Coventry.

Grindlay further expanded his manufacturing operations in 1936 when he formed Coventry Engineering Company. Specialising in machine parts and jigs, tool fixtures and gauges, early work involved assisting with the production of aircraft guns as part of the arms build up ahead of the war. Support for the war effort expanded to include the development of pitch propellers, barrage balloons, aircraft fuselages and control gear.

== Motor industry ==
Formed in 1923, Grindlay Peerless, which operated out of Melbourne Works on Shakleton Road in Spon End, Coventry, entered into the wider motorcycle market in the early 1920s, and began making high-powered racing machines. Like the Grindlay Sidecars before them, they employed numerous technological advances and innovative engineering, which included utilising early aircraft design features.

CWG 'Bill' Lacey became the first man to exceed a 100 miles in an hour on British soil in August 1928 aboard his modified 498cc Grindlay Peerless. The bike covered 103.3 miles in the hour at Brooklands racing circuit in Surrey to secure a Fédération Internationale de Motocyclisme (FIM) world record.

In 1929, Bill Lacey broke the record again on his Grindlay Peerless, by covering 105.87 miles in the hour at Autodrome de Linasc-Montlhéry, Montlhéry, in France.

When Grindlay founded Coventry Engineering Company in 1936, it became his third pioneering motorcycle engineering firm.

== Government ==
=== Councillor and Alderman ===
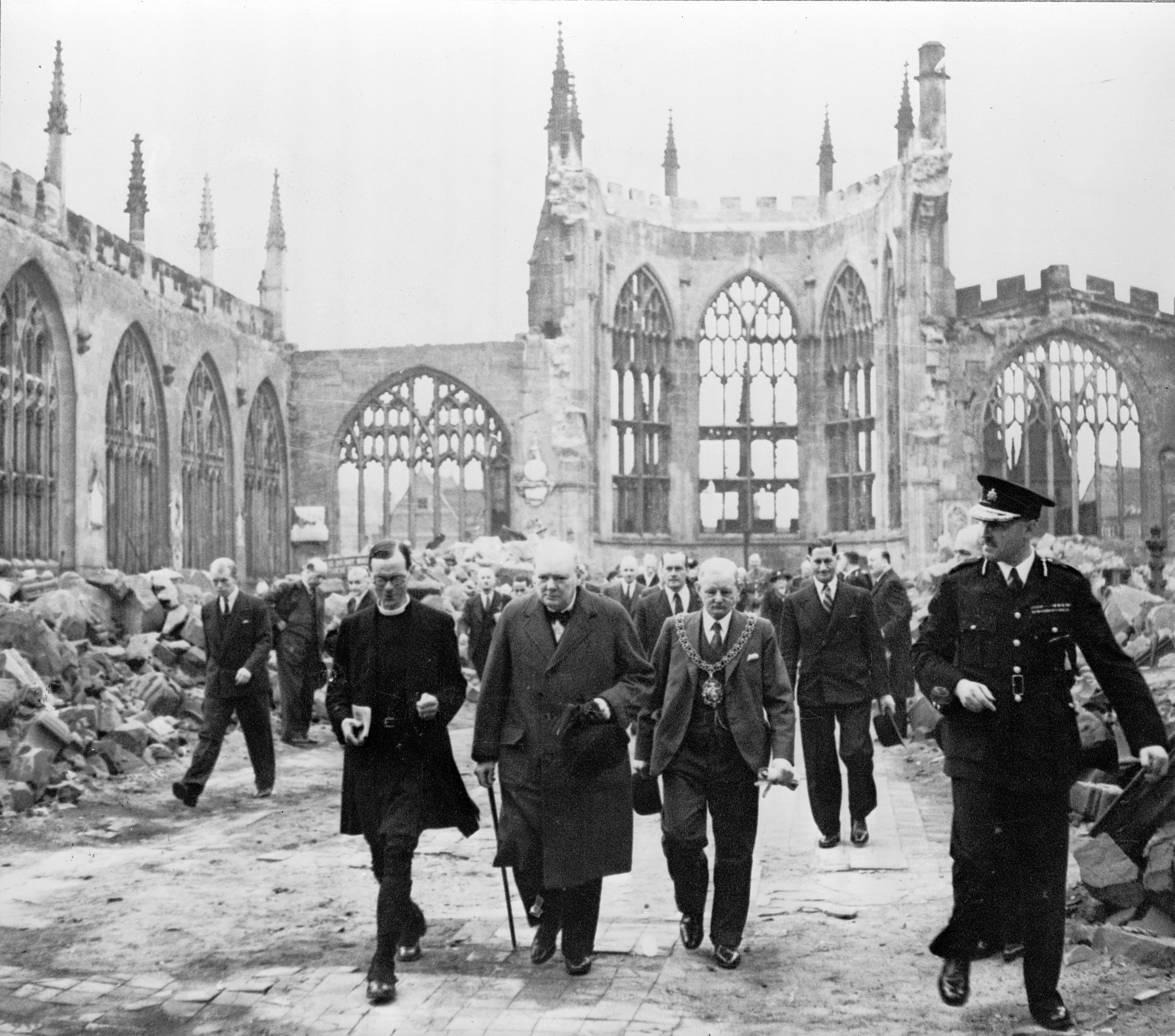
J A Moseley, A R Grindlay and others escorting Winston Churchill through the ruins of Coventry Cathedral in September 1941 after it was severely damaged during the Coventry Blitz

Grindlay was a prominent member of Coventry City Council. Joining the council in May 1924 when elected the representative for Greyfriars Ward, he dedicated much of his life to local government in Coventry and wider Warwickshire.

Throughout his time in government he held several additional positions, including chairmanships of the Coventry Progressive Party, the Waterworks and Fire Brigade, the Libraries and Museum Committee, the City Redevelopment Committee, Coventry Savings Committee as part of the National Savings Movement, as well as membership of the Coventry Chamber of Commerce.

Grindlay was generally regarded as a member of the Conservative opposition in the Council, though he described himself as a "Liberal in thought, but not a member of any political party".

On 8 June 1946, Grindlay was present at the laying of the Coventry Levelling Stone, which marks the theodolite point for the rebuilding of Coventry city centre and from which all central building levels were subsequently taken. A symbol of Coventry’s regeneration following the bombardment of WWII, he laid the mortar for the ceremonial placement of the stone, and his name and office form part of the surrounding inscription.

Grindlay was elected an Alderman in 1950.

=== Mayor of Coventry ===
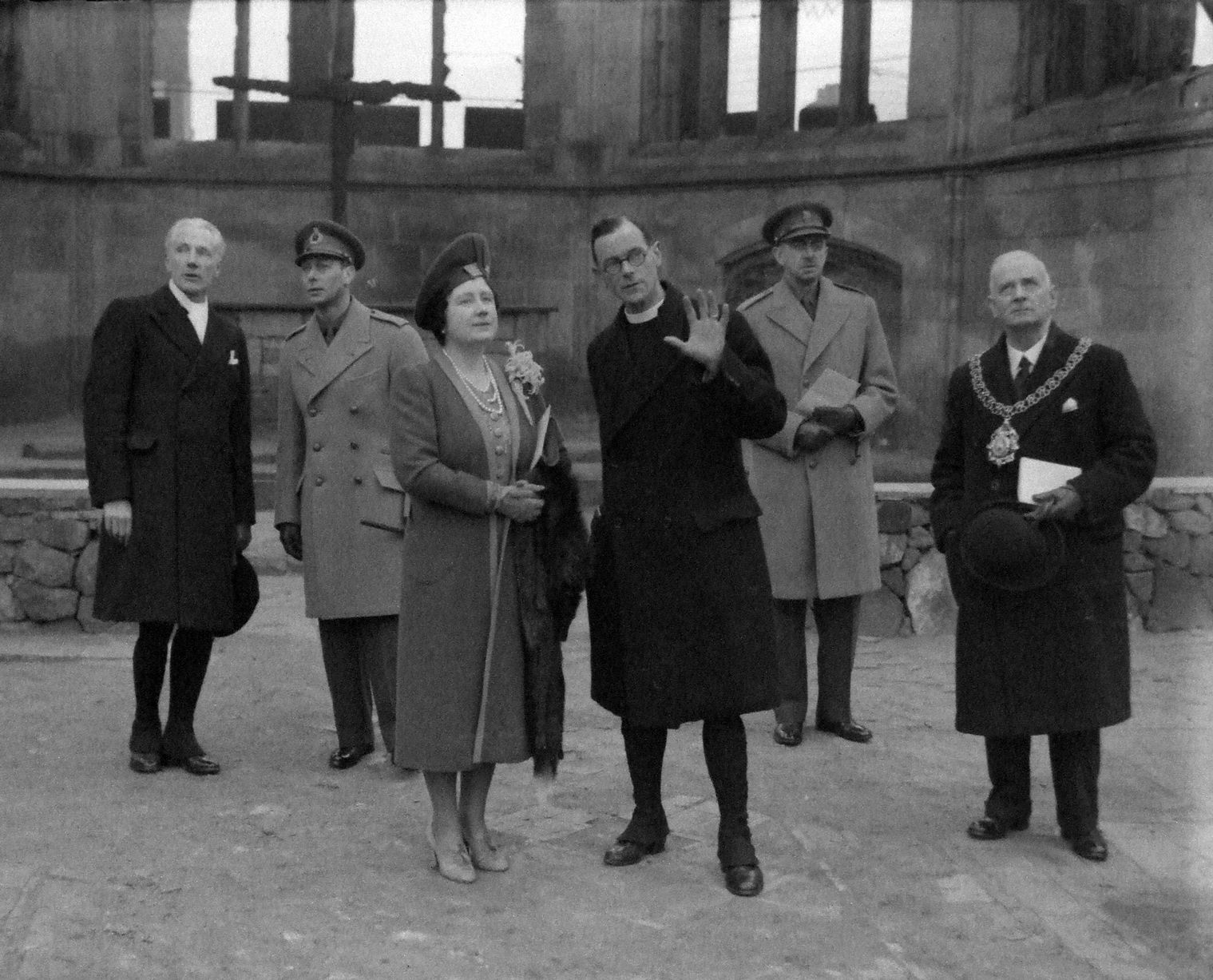
King George VI and Queen Elizabeth visit Coventry Cathedral with A R Grindlay and M G Haigh, the Bishop of Coventry, 25 February 1942

During WWII, Grindlay was appointed Deputy Mayor of Coventry in 1940 under John Albert Moseley, and then elected Mayor of Coventry (later styled Lord Mayor) in 1941, becoming in full, The Right Worshipful the Mayor of Coventry, Councillor Alfred Robert Grindlay CBE, JP.

He presided over Coventry throughout the Coventry Blitz when the city was devastated by aerial bombing campaigns, particularly the notorious November 1940 raid during which Coventry Cathedral was destroyed, and the April 1941 attack that saw 230 bombers attack the city, dropping 315 tons of high explosive and 25,000 incendiaries. Grindlay led much of the early work to rebuild the city following the bombing, and a large portion of the city owes its design origins to his directives.

As Mayor of Coventry, Grindlay could impale the City of Coventry arms (dexter) with his family arms (sinister)

On 14 October 1942, in response to the war-time solidarity that had developed between the people of Coventry and Stalingrad (now Volgograd), in a telegram to the people of Stalingrad, Grindlay wrote:

"The inhabitants of Coventry will never forget the sacrifices which were endured by Stalingrad. They express to you, the people of Stalingrad, their feelings of special sympathy and admiration for your great courage and iron determination to fight until victory." – A R Grindlay, 1942

This close war-time relationship, fostered by Grindlay and the citizens of Coventry, resulted in the twinning of the two cities in 1944, becoming what became known as sister cities.^{[b]} This act of comradeship started a trend that spread across Europe and the rest of the world.

== Social engagement and philanthropy ==
Grindlay was a keen sportsman and prominent figure in the Coventry sporting world, remaining involved with various clubs and associations throughout his life. His love of amateur football, beginning with his playing for Foleshill Great Heath Football Club in his youth, was a passion shared by his wife, Emma, and which culminated in his becoming vice-president of Coventry City Football Club. He was also chairman of Coventry and Warwickshire Motor Club, vice-president of Coventry Cricket Club, and a member the Coventry Hearsall and Coventry Golf Clubs.

A committed philanthropist, in his role as chairman of the Coventry Hospital Carnival Committee, Grindlay oversaw the organisation of 16 carnivals and 2 "Godiva" processions that raised more than £60,000 for the hospital, attracting visitors from around the world and to wide public acclaim, before it was eventually taken over by the government. It was at one of these processions that his second son, Alfred Stephen Chaplin Grindlay, would meet his future wife, Frances Phyllis Burchell, who as an accomplished horse rider played the role of Lady Godiva. He also contributed to the hospital by sitting on both its General and House Committees. In addition to his works with the city council, Grindlay was a Freemason like many of the wider Grindlay family, and contributed to many charities and philanthropic projects through his membership of the Trinity Lodge and Trinity Royal Arch Chapter.

"Few public men have had a busier life than Mr. Grindlay, the ramifications of whose work embrace practically every phase of civic, social, business, sporting and philanthropic activity." – Coventry Evening Telegraph, 1940

Grindlay was a Methodist and while living in Foleshill, was an active member of the Free Methodist Church on Station Street West, formerly Carpenter's Lane, and held all of the posts that were open to laymen. In his later years he went on to become the President of the Coventry and District Free Church Council.

In 1941, William Michael Maddocks, son of Sir Henry Maddocks, asked Grindlay to write the foreword to his commemorative novel, The City We Loved – Coventry, published in 1942, which details the story of the destruction of Coventry's medieval centre by the 1940 and 1941 blitzkrieg campaigns of Nazi Germany.

== Public honours ==
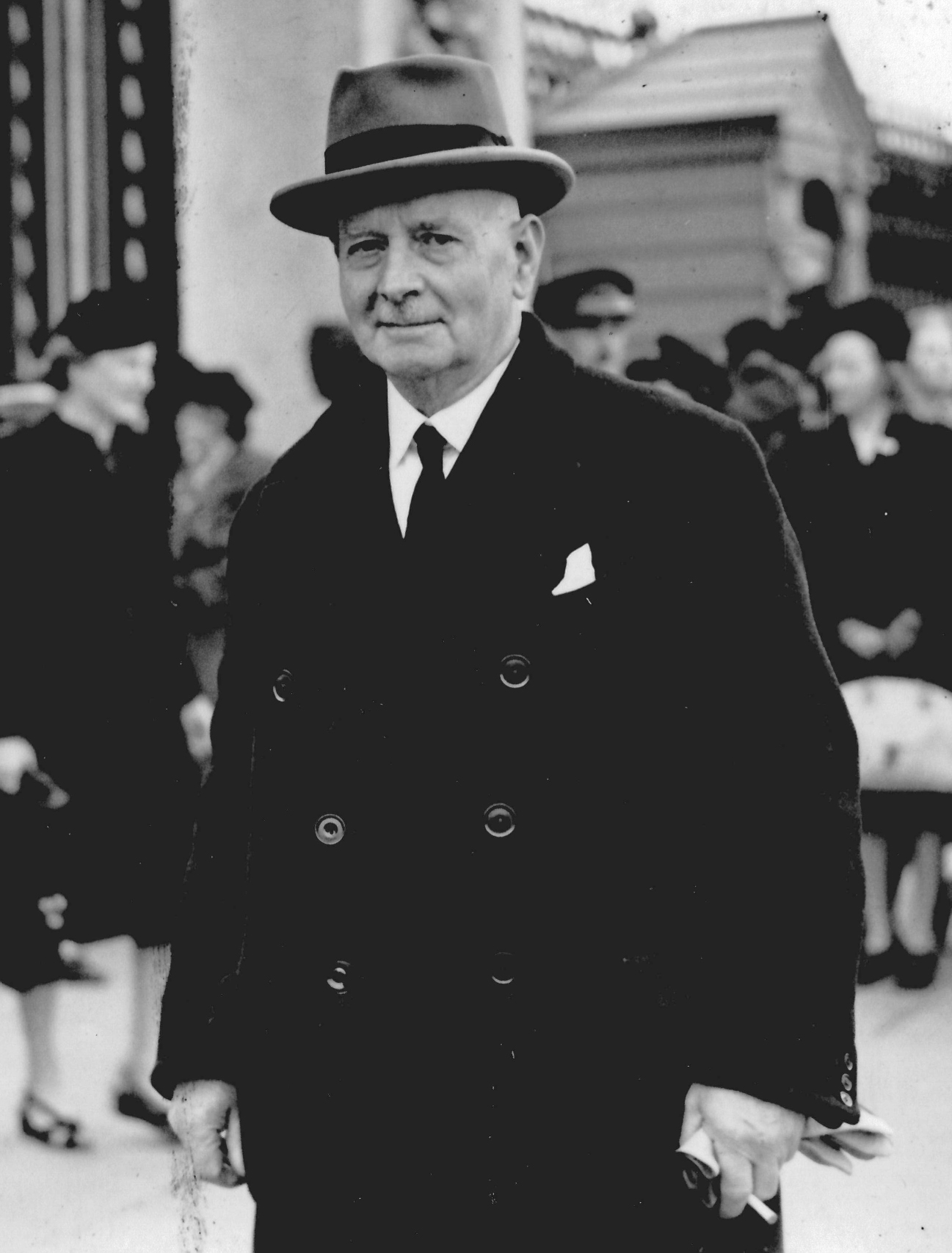
A R Grindlay outside Buckingham Palace, 20 May 1947

In 1943, Grindlay was made an Officer of the Order of the British Empire (OBE) for his work as Chairman of the Coventry Saving Committee and Chairman of the City Redevelopment Committee. Three years later in 1946 he was made a Commander of the Order of the British Empire (CBE) for his service to the nation and personally commended for his efforts by King George VI. The formal investiture took place on Tuesday 20 May 1947 at Buckingham Palace.

Having been a Coventry City Councillor for nearly 39 years, Grindlay was awarded the Honorary Freemanship of the City of Coventry on 15 November 1962.^{[c]} His award is described by Coventry City Council as being "in recognition of his eminent and devoted service to the city during a period of unprecedented municipal development and as a token of public esteem". Grindlay was also nominated for a Baronetcy for his wartime leadership and dedication to public service, but died before the honour could be bestowed.^{[d]}

On 1 July 1965, Coventry City Council announced that a redevelopment in Windsor Street, Spon End was to be named Grindlay House in his honour.

== Later life ==
Grindlay retired from the council on 21 May 1964 at the age of 88 after serving for 40 years. He died at his home at Trinity House in Coventry in 1965 aged 89 years, and was buried at All Saint's Church, Allesley on 2 June 1965. He is remembered as the "Father of Coventry City Council".

== See also ==
- Grindlay family
- Grindlay Peerless
- List of Grindlay Peerless people
- Trinity House, the primary residence of A R Grindlay.
- Derwent Island House, one of a number of residences of the Grindlay family during the 20th century.
- History of Coventry
- Coventry Blitz
- Grindlays Bank
- 1943 Birthday Honours
- 1946 New Year Honours
- List of mayors of Coventry

== Footnotes ==
^a Both of Grindlay's sons, Reginald and Alfred Stephen, later joined and expanded the family engineering businesses.
^b The close relationship between Coventry and Stalingrad, initiated and fostered by Grindlay, continues to the present day with regular analogous celebrations in both cities on the anniversary of the Battle of Stalingrad.
^c The Honorary Freedom of the City of Coventry (a more prestigious award than the historic Freedom of the City qualified by apprenticeship), has been granted to only a very small number of prominent individuals. As of 2026 there have been 16 awardees in total, only 14 of which to individuals. Others include Andrew Carnegie, Alfred Edward Herbert, William Richard Morris, 1st Viscount Nuffield, Edward Langton Iliffe, 2nd Baron Iliffe, Marjorie Mowlam, Ratan Tata, and Sushanta Kumar Bhattacharyya, Baron Bhattacharyya.
^d Members of Coventry City Council proposed Grindlay have the further honour of a baronetcy bestowed upon him by the Lord Chancellor. Although the title of Sir Alfred Robert Grindlay, 1st Baronet of Allesley was under consideration at the time, it was not formally conferred before his death in 1965 and became a Ghost Baronetcy. In accordance with the Standing Council of Baronetage, the line of succession of the baronetcy would have been as follows:
- Sir Alfred Robert Grindlay, 1st Baronet (1876–1965)
- Sir Reginald Robert Grindlay, 2nd Baronet (1899–1965)
- Sir Robert Vernon Grindlay, 3rd Baronet (1926–1991)
- Sir Simon Robert Grindlay, 4th Baronet (b. 1956)
The heir apparent to the baronetcy would be Guy Robert Grindlay (b. 1989)
