= List of Grindlay Peerless people =

The following are key individuals associated with the 1923 – 1939 UK motorcycle manufacturer Grindlay Peerless.

== Grindlay family ==
=== Alfred Robert Grindlay ===
Alfred Robert Grindlay CBE, JP, was born in Coventry in 1876, son of William Vaughan Grindlay (1843 – 1891). Upon leaving school, Alfred joined a local cycle firm and began learning the skills he would employ to great effect later in his career and by 1901 be was working at Riley Cycle Company, one of the major firms in the Coventry. Grindlay progressed steadily within the company, until 1911, while working as a foreman at Riley Cycle Company, he applied for a patent (24,683) regarding 'improved means for carrying spare wheels' for motorcars. That same year Alfred left Riley Cycle Company and took over the Coventry Motor & Sundries business, establishing Grindlay Sidecars.

During World War I he combined forces with Thomas Edward Musson (b. 1875) founding Musson & Grindlay, specialising in sidecar production. However, parting ways with Musson in 1923, Alfred established Grindlay Peerless.

By the late 1920s, Alfred's two sons, Reginald Robert Grindlay (b. 1900), and Alfred Stephen Chaplin Grindlay (b. 1910) had joined the company and begun to take greater responsibilities including assisting their father to develop a two-seater sports car based on the original Morris 8 light car. Multiple versions were available and in several colours. Production lasted around two years, and the company reverted to general motor body building and engineering, lasting through to 1996.

In addition to his contribution to the British motor industry, Grindlay was a prominent Coventry City Council member. In 1943, he was made an Officer of the Order of the British Empire (OBE) for his work as Chairman of the Coventry Saving Committee.

During the World War II, in 1941, Alfred was appointed Mayor of Coventry. He presided over Coventry during the notorious period of the Coventry Blitz and led work to rebuild the city afterwards, for which he was made a Commander of the Order of the British Empire (CBE) in 1946, for his service to the nation and was personally commended for his efforts by King George VI. The formal investiture took place on Tuesday 20 May 1947 at Buckingham Palace.

Having been a Coventry City Councillor for nearly 39 years, Grindlay was award the Freedom of the City on 15 November 1962. His award is described by Coventry City Council as being "In recognition of his eminent and devoted service to the city during a period of unprecedented municipal development and as a token of public esteem".

Alfred died in Coventry in 1965 aged 89 years.

=== Reginald Robert Grindlay ===
Reginald Robert Grindlay was born in 1899 in Foleshill, Warwickshire, and attended Bablake School as a boy. Following his service aboard an Allied minesweeper vessel during the Great War, for which he earned the British War Medal and Victory Medal, in the late 1920s he followed his father into the family automotive business helping to develop the Grindlay Peerless racing brand. Reginald was a passionate motorcycle racer and was regularly involved in competitions at Brooklands motor-racing circuit. In 1924 he married Vera Irene Smith.

A prominent Freemason, Reginald was a co-founder and officer designate of Stivichall Lodge No. 5799 in Coventry. He was also a member of the Grand Lodge of England, the Provincial Lodge of Warwickshire, and was a master of the Victory Lodge No.4009 in Coventry.

Reginald spent much of his life at his primary residence, Holly Lodge in Berkswell, Warwickshire but spent his final months at his country house, Derwent Island House in Cumbria, dying in nearby Cockermouth in 1965, aged 66. He is buried at All Saints Church in Allesley, Coventry.

=== Alfred Stephen Chaplin Grindlay ===
Alfred Stephen Chaplin Grindlay was born in 1909 and joined his father and older brother into the automotive industry. He was for a time, the general manager and director of the Coventry Motor Sundries Limited, and the director of the Coventry Engineering Company. In 1938 he married Francis Phyllis Burchell, an accomplished horse rider who played the role of Lady Godiva during the Coventry Hospital Carnival in the early 1930s.

Alfred was an active sportsman and mountaineer, playing rugby for Old Coventrians Rugby Football Club and Coventry Rugby Club. On Easter Monday 1934, Alfred fell 150 ft while climbing in North Wales, landing on a narrow ledge above a sheer cliff edge. He escaped the accident without injury and was transported to hospital in Bangor.

== Racing ==
=== Bill Lacey ===
C.W.G. 'Bill' Lacey, along with Francis Beart, Bert le Vack, E.C.E. 'Ted' Barragwanath, Joe Potts, and Steve Lancefield, was a Brooklands racer and world record holder.

Born around the turn of the 20th century, Lacey first started racing at Brooklands in 1922 on a 499 cc (30.5 cu in) Rudge Multi. In 1924 he won his first race, a 500cc Junior Handicap race, reaching speeds of 81.91 mph (131.82 km/h) on a 344 cc (21.0 cu in) Cotton-J.A.P. This was the beginning of a long career in motorsport, that saw Lacey become internationally renowned for his achievements in the late 1920s and early 1930s.

Meticulous in both his dress and motorcycle preparation, Lacey was the ideal racer, weighing in at only 8.5 stone (119 lb; 54 kg). Winning his coveted Brooklands Gold Star (awarded for a rider's first 100 mph (160 km/h) and over lap in a given class) in 1927 on his 498cc Grindlay Peerless, he hit the headlines again in 1928 by becoming the first rider to cover over 100 miles (160 km) in a single hour, riding a 500 cc (31 cu in) machine on British soil, again at Brooklands. The personally modified 498cc Grindlay Peerless (Lacey fashioned his own pushrods, their tubes, cams, rocker gear and rocker box castings and used an experimental Brampton front-fork which had progressive friction dampening) covered 103.9 miles in the hour for a Fédération Internationale de Motocyclisme (FIM) world record.

In 1929 at Autodrome de Linas-Montlhéry, France, Bert Denly broke Lacey's record on an AJS motorcycle. However Lacey took back the record only a week later covering 105.78 mph (170.24 km/h) at Montlhéry. In 1931, Lacey broke the record for a third time covering 111.45 mph (179.36 km/h), again at Montlhéry, but this time on a Norton motorcycle.

After his retirement from racing, Lacey based himself in Slough to focused on managing his precision engineering business where he tuned and modified both cars and motorcycles for customers and friends. Lacey retired from business in the 1950s, but in 1959 was persuaded to tune Norton motorcycle engines for John Hartle and Stan Hailwood's son, Mike Hailwood. The culmination of this partnership was Hailwood's 1961 Senior TT win. Following this, Bill Lacey again retired from motorcycling, to concentrate on race car engine preparation, particularly GP units.

Aged 85, enthusiastic for new challenges, Bill learnt to fly a microlight before his death in November 1989 aged 88 years.

=== Francis Beart ===
Francis Beart was a motorcycle racer and later tuner of motorcycles and Formula 3 cars. Beart holds the unbroken record for the Test Hill of 6.99 seconds (an average of 34.55 mph), riding a Grindlay Peerless fitted with a 500cc speedway type J.A.P. engine. He came off at the top of the climb but was uninjured; the attempts were discontinued after this.

=== Edmond Tubb ===
Edmond Joseph 'Boy' Tubb was a 1930s motorcycle enthusiast and racer. Following Bill Lacey's record in 1928, a number of replicas of his machine - the Brooklands 'Hundred Model' were produced, however only a handful, believed to be no more than five or six machines were ever made. Only two of these are known to have survived to this day; one first owned by Brooklands and Manx Grand Prix competitor Joe Potts, the other which belonged to prominent Vintage Motor Cycle Club (VMCC) member, the late Edmond Joseph 'Boy' Tubb, who won his Brooklands 'Gold Star' aboard the Grindlay.

Tubb bought his Grindlay in November 1935 from a fellow Brooklands competitor named McClure. Results were disappointing at first, the best lap speed being around 88 mph (142 km/h), and so the engine was despatched to E.C.E. 'Ted' Baragwanath, the famous Brooklands rider/tuner and J.A.P agent, for upgrading. Baragwanath fitted a longer con-rod (raising the cylinder barrel to compensate), swapped the twin-port cylinder head for a single-port version, and installed cams developed by Bert le Vack. He also helped sort out the handling, screwing the Grindlay's steering damper down tight, which cured it of a tendency to 'wobble' at high speed. The result was the coveted 'Gold Star' at over 102 mph (164 km/h) and Tubb went onto achieve numerous successes with the revitalised Grindlay, including his fastest Brooklands lap on 30 June 1937 at over 105 mph (169 km/h).

With the costs of racing the Grindlay becoming prohibitive, Baragwanath had to rebuild the engine twice, on the second occasion following a major blow-up in 1937, Tubb retired the bike and after World War II its use was confined to sprinting. When the Brooklands Museum opened in the late 1980s, he offered the Grindlay, which had been restored in the 1970s, for display there. Cared for by John Bottomley and the Museum's voluntary motorcycle group, the Tubb Grindlay-Peerless was tested for The Classic MotorCycle by Roy Poynting in 2006, and in recent years has been used by the Brooklands Museum on numerous demonstration runs.

In 2012, the restored 1929 Grindlay Peerless 498 cc (30.4 cu in) Brooklands Hundred Model sold at auction for UK£67,580.

=== Pip Harris ===
Pip Harris was a British motorcycle racer specialising in the sidecar class. Harris won his first grass-tracking event in 1945 on a modified pre war Grindlay Peerless, the aptly nicknamed Grindlay 'Bitza'.

=== Walter Hartley 'Wal' Phillips ===
Wal Phillips was a motorcycle tuner and racer during the 1920s and 1930s. A nephew of Bert le Vack, he won the 350cc 200 Mile Solo race at Brooklands racetrack on a 346cc Grindlay Peerless in 1928, and won at Brooklands again 1931 on another Grindlay Peerless.
