= Trinity House, Allesley =

Former Country House in Coventry

Trinity House
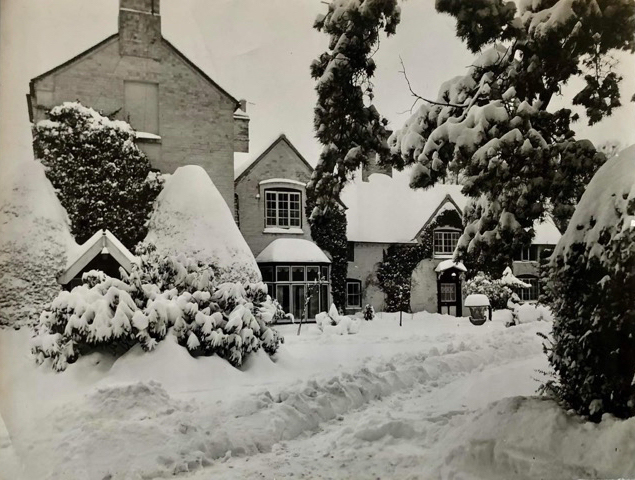
- East face of Trinity House

- Location within West Midlands county

General information
- Type: Country house
- Architectural style: Tudor, Jacobean, Victorian
- Location: Rectory Lane, Allesley, Coventry, England
- Coordinates: 52°25′27.55″N 1°33′33.23″W
- Demolished: 1966

Technical details
- Floor count: 3
- Grounds: Approx. 3 acres (1.2 ha), with additional outbuildings and cottages

Other information
- Number of rooms: 20–25

Trinity House was a small country house in the village of Allesley, Coventry in the West Midlands, formerly the county of Warwickshire. It stood at the end of Rectory Lane immediately north-west of All Saints Church on the crest of the hill between the River Sherbourne and Pickford Brook. The house became one of "the lost houses" of England after being demolished in the mid-1960s as part of the wider destruction of country houses in 20th-century Britain.

== History ==
The original structure was likely late medieval, similar to the nearby Stone House and other notable surrounding structures close to the All Saints Church. The house was greatly expanded over the following centuries, growing from a cottage to one of the larger country houses in the area.

At its fullest extent the house formed a large T shape, having been constructed and then enlarged during three separate and distinct architectural periods. The earliest parts were the Tudor cottage rooms which formed the far end of the length of the house and included the original medieval doorway. During the 17th century, a Jacobean style dining room, breakfast room and large additional bedrooms were added to the south side of the house, and acted as the central conjoining section. Lastly, a large 3-storey Victorian wing was added in the early 19th century, running perpendicular to the earlier structure, and becoming the principal part of the house with an ashlar stonework facade facing out over the lawns and gardens.

In 1966 the house was demolished and the land used for the development of 13 separate detached houses that now form Rectory Close.

The wider grounds of the house contained several outbuildings including the gardener's cottage, known as Trinity Cottage, which has survived to this day though now heavily modified.

== Grindlay family (1924–1965) ==
In the early 20th century the house came into the possession of the Warwickshire branch of the Grindlay family, when Alfred Robert Grindlay, the English industrialist, official and future Mayor of Coventry took up residence with his wife and sons.

The family held numerous events at the house including ward and district fêtes, charity pageants, and gatherings of local political groups including the Coventry YWCA, the Coventry Liberal Association, and the Coventry Progressive Party. Alfred and his wife, Emma Grindlay (née Chaplin), were keen gardeners and made considerable improvements to the grounds resulting in their winning several awards at various competitions and open days.

The house sheltered 4 generations of the Grindlays of Trinity House, who were the final owners before its sale in 1965 and eventual demolition in 1966.

== Gallery ==
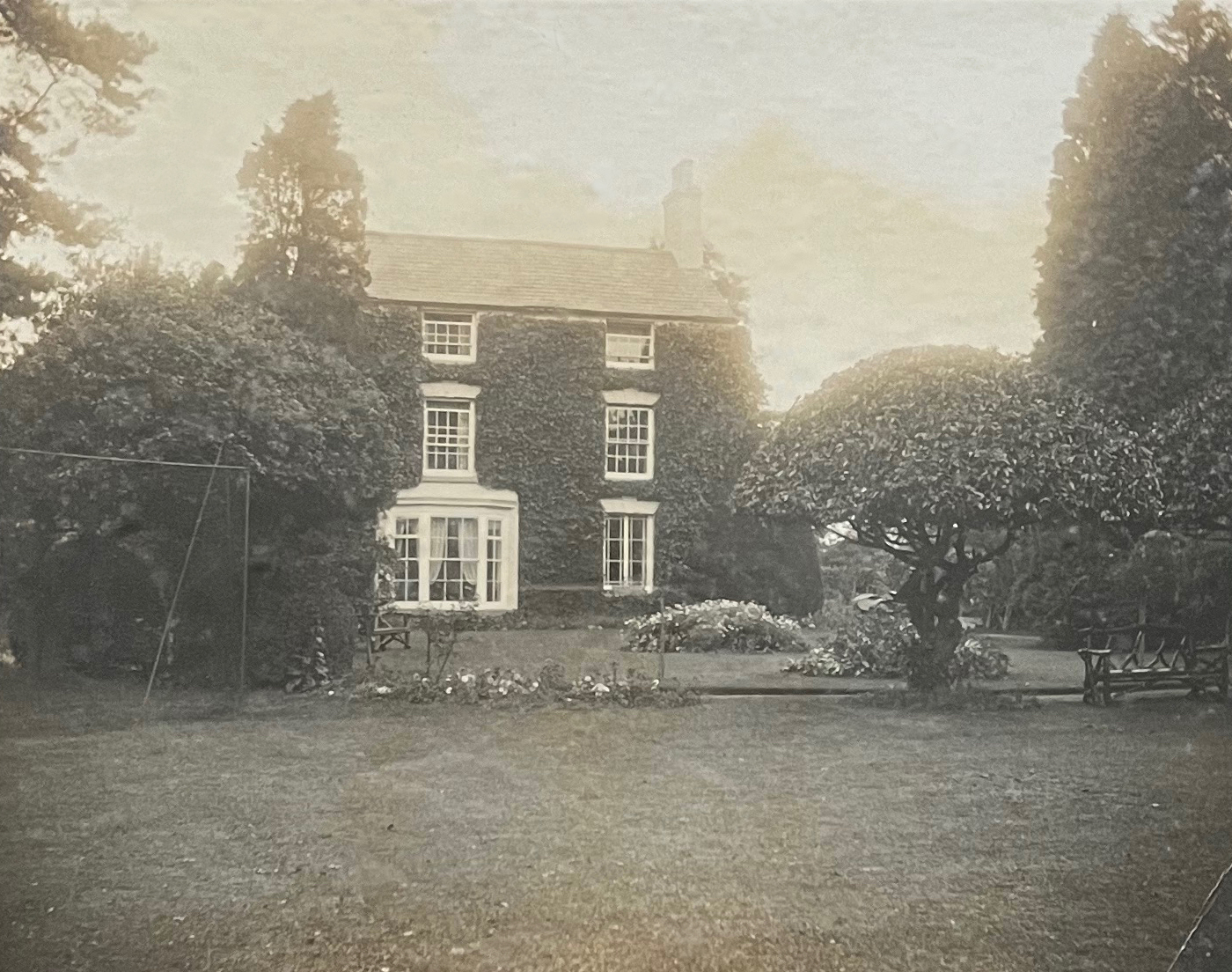
South face of Trinity House

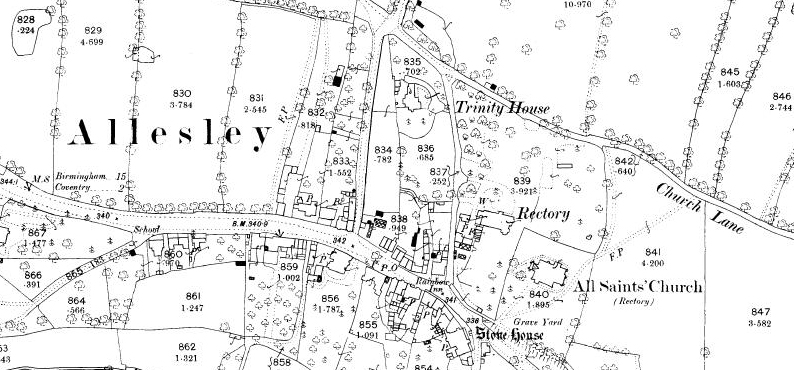
Map of Allesley (1884–1889)

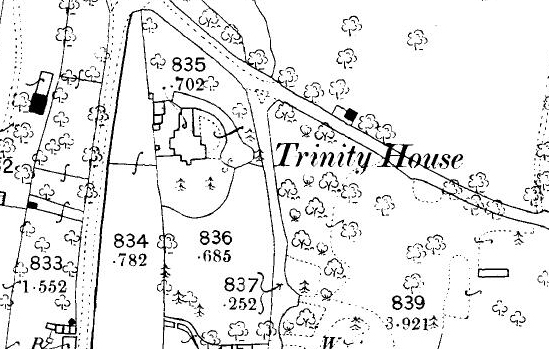
Trinity House and grounds on map of north Allesley (1884–1889)

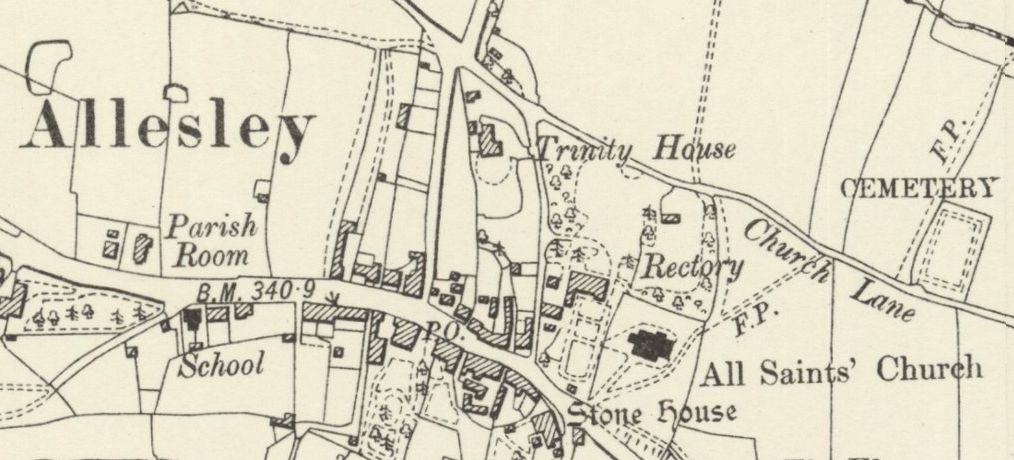
Map of Allesley and Trinity House (1900–1910)
