= The Elms, Coventry =

Coordinates: 52°25′19″N 1°33′23″W

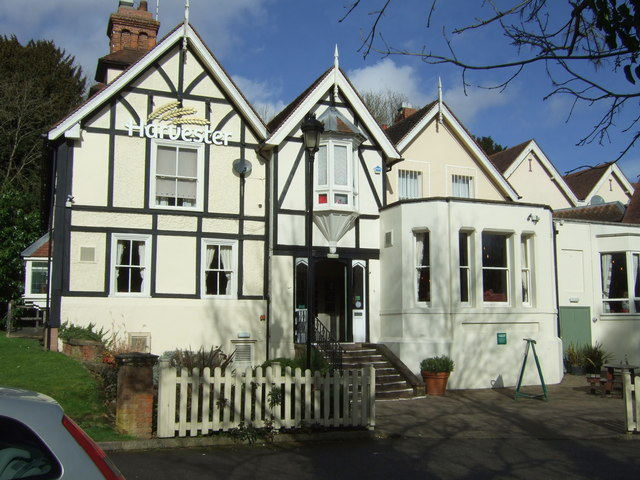
- The Elms in 2017
- Former names: Paybody Convalescent Home; Paybody Orthopaedic Hospital; Paybody Eye Hospital

General information
- Location: Allesley, Coventry, England
- Year built: From 1590
- Landlord: Harvester

The Elms, operated by the Harvester chain, is a pub and restaurant, former eye hospital and former children's convalescent home on the Birmingham Road in Allesley, Coventry, West Midlands, England.

== History ==
The Elms is housed in a timber-framed two storey building, built from 1590, with the earliest surviving parts of the structure dating to the 1660s. It is located next to All Saints Church and was a private residence until the 1920s.

In 1928, Coventry businessman and philanthropist Thomas Paybody purchased the Elms and its 12 acre grounds. He presented the building to the Coventry and District Crippled Children’s Guild. The building opened as the Paybody Convalescent Home for children in September 1929, with an extension for another ward built in 1931, at the request of the Minister of Health and the Board of Education. The building became the Paybody Orthopaedic Hospital from 1938 to 1963, then operated as the Paybody Eye Hospital, until 1991.

The Elms is currently a pub and restaurant operated by the Harvester chain. It is a locally listed building.
