= Coventry Sallet =

15th-century helmet

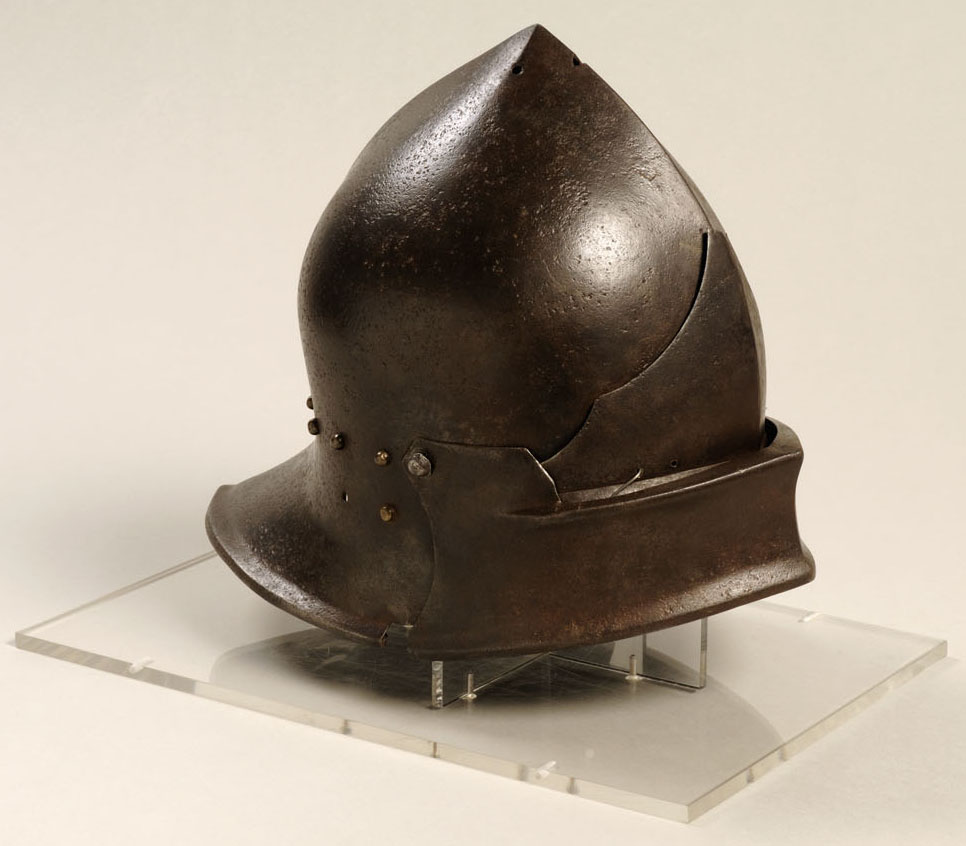
- The Coventry Sallet
- Material: Steel
- Created: c. 1460
- Present location: Herbert Art Gallery and Museum, Coventry
- Registration: AR.1962.54

The Coventry Sallet is a 15th-century helmet now on display at Herbert Art Gallery and Museum. English sallets have been considered both rare and important.

== Description ==
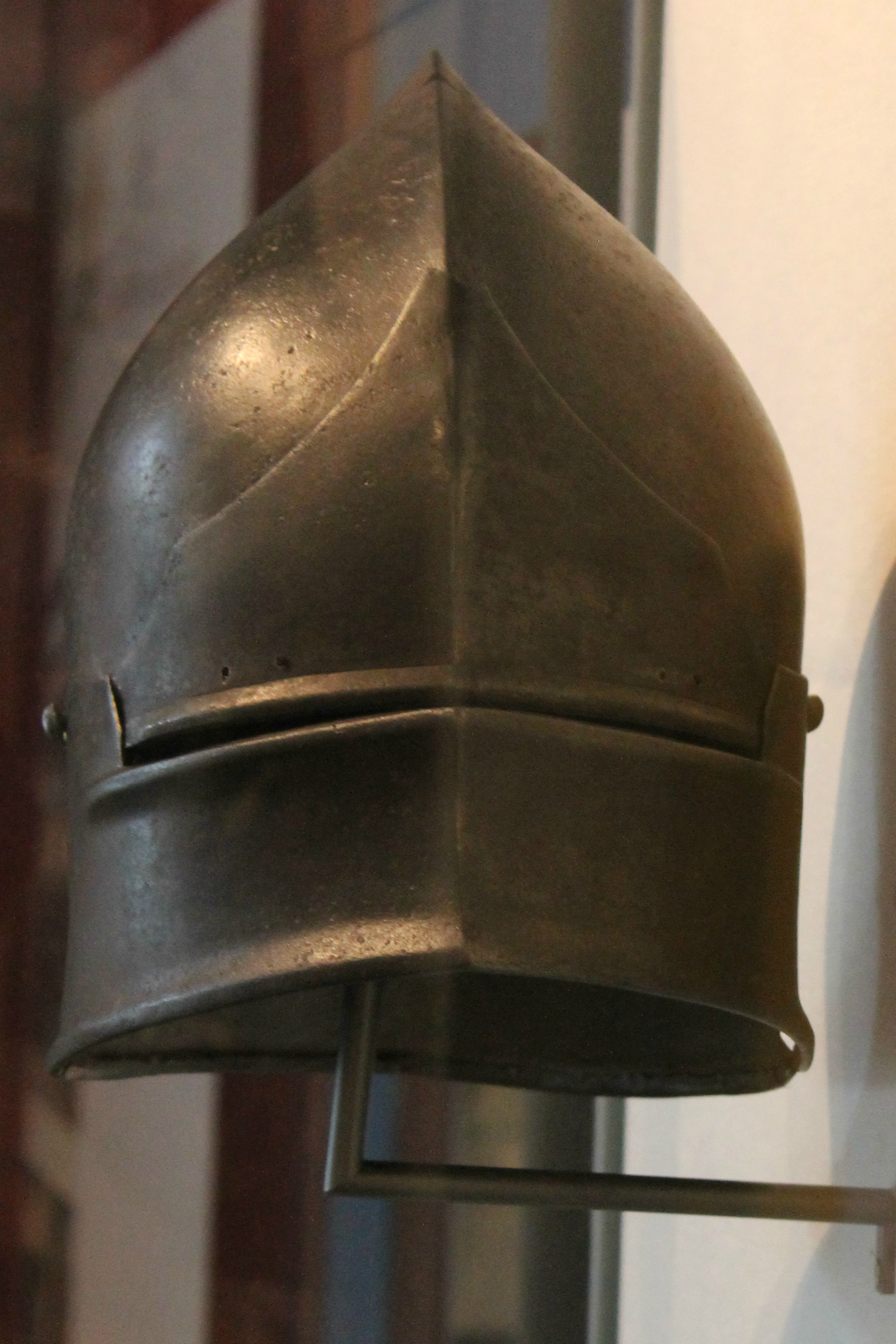
The Sallet seen from the front

The Sallet is 11 inches (28 cm) in height, 12.25 inches (31.1 cm) from front to back and is 7.75 inches (19.7 cm) wide. It weighs 5.25 pounds (2.38 kg). It has a short tail and a jawbone type visor with a brow reinforcing. Stylistically, it is termed a "high crowned" helmet, different from the style usually seen in Italy or Germany. A plume holder was added to the helmet at some time after its manufacture.

== History ==
The helmet was made around 1460, during the period of English civil conflict known as the Wars of the Roses, and the armourer's marks suggest that it was made by an artisan originating from Italy. During the 19th century it was used in Coventry's Godiva Procession. For a period it was kept on display at St Mary's Hall, Coventry, and is now shown at the city's Herbert Art Gallery and Museum.

Very few pieces of English-made armour survive from this period; the Coventry Sallet is believed to be the only example of its type in England.
