= Dormer Cottage =

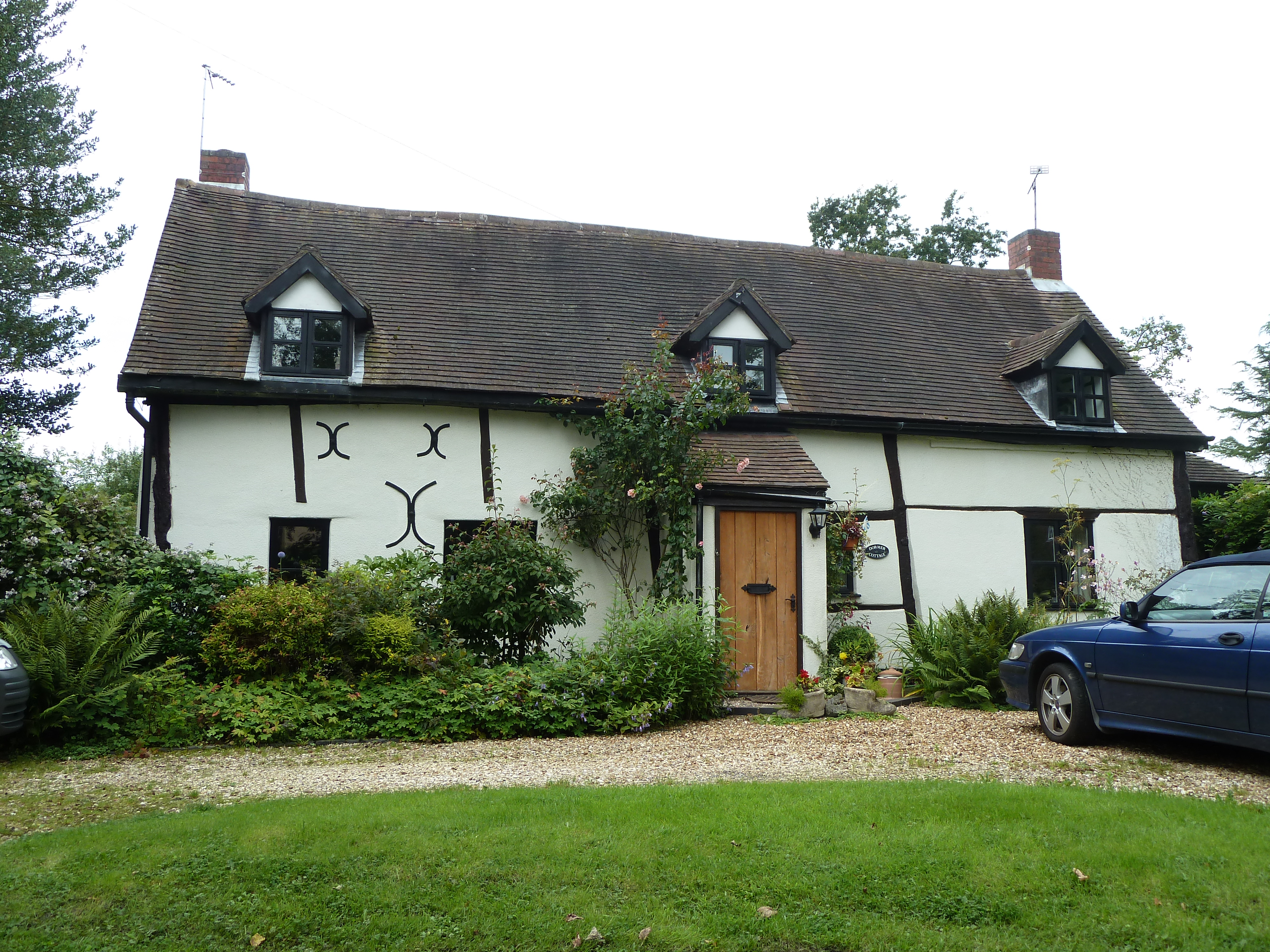

- Location within West Midlands county

General information
- Status: Grade I listed
- Location: Coventry, United Kingdom
- Coordinates: 52.4355°N 1.5698°W
- Completed: 17th century
- Owner: Privately owned

Dormer Cottage is a Grade II listed building on Washbrook Lane, in the Allesley area of the City of Coventry, in the West Midlands of England. The house was probably constructed in the mid-17th century and extended in the 20th century.

The building is a timber frame construction, decorated with pebbledash on the exterior, and consists of a single story with an attic. Decorative windows were added in the 20th century, along with a porch, which covers the front door.
