= Grindlay Peerless =

Former English motorcycle manufacturer

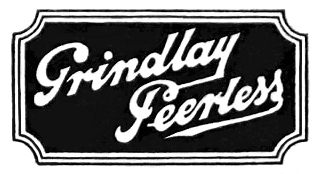
- Type: Private company
- Industry: Motorcycles
- Predecessor: Grindlay Sidecars
- Founded: 1923; 103 years ago
- Founder: Alfred Robert Grindlay, Edward Peerless
- Defunct: 1939; 87 years ago
- Headquarters: Coventry, West Midlands, England
- Key people: List of Grindlay Peerless people

Grindlay Peerless was a motorcycle manufacturer which operated out of Coventry, England, throughout the early 20th-century, specialising in racing machines including the record breaking 498cc Grindlay Peerless.

Although a short-lived marque, Grindlay Peerless secured a number of achievements, most notably that of works rider and tuner, CWG 'Bill' Lacey, achieving a Fédération Internationale de Motocyclisme (FIM) world record by becoming the first man to exceed a 100 miles in an hour on British soil in August 1928 aboard his Grindlay Peerless. The company was renowned for building powerful, high quality and technologically advanced machines.

The very limited number of Grindlay Peerless machines produced means that they are now extremely rare.

== History ==
In 1910, following his departure from Riley Cycle Company, Alfred Robert Grindlay and his brother, William John Grindlay (a member of the highly exclusive Coventry and Country Club) took over Coventry Motor & Sundries Co. from William Edward Mann. The company was remodelled into Grindlay Sidecars, which originally began manufacturing body kits and sidecars in the early 1910s, and quickly became known for its "extremely high quality" machines.

During WWI, Grindlay and Thomas Edward Musson (b. 1875) combined their efforts to form the specialist sidecar manufacturer, Musson & Grindlay, operating out of Melbourne Works on Shakleton Road in Spon End, Coventry. In 1923, following the dissolution of his partnership with Musson, Grindlay and Edward Peerless (b. 1878), who had trained as an engine fitter in Gillingham, Kent, formed Grindlay Peerless.

The newly formed Grindlay Peerless also now operating out of Melbourne Works, entered into the wider motorcycle market in 1923, and began making high-powered machines using JAP (succeeded by Villiers), Barr & Stroud, and later Rudge-Whitworth engines. Like the sidecars before them, the motorcycles not only had an exceptional standard of finish, including pressed monograms, elegantly shaped fuel tanks brightly plated with nickel and cadmium, and luxury leather covered saddles, but were also recognised for their innovative design features.

While active Grindlay Peerless produced a large number of highly regarded motorcycles, including the record breaking 498cc model, but by the mid-1930s the Great Depression caused production to reduce significantly and the company dissolved in 1939.

=== Timeline ===
- 1923 – Alfred Robert Grindlay and Edward Peerless form Grindlay Peerless
- 1923 – Grindlay Peerless 1000cc V-twin flagship model (Barr & Stroud engine) released
- 1924 – Grindlay Peerless 488cc single OHV model (JAP engine) released
- 1925 – Grindlay Peerless 344cc, 346cc, 348cc (JAP engines) and 499cc sleeve-value models (Barr & Stroud engine) released
- 1926 – Bill Lacey begins winning regularly on a tuned 344cc, beginning with the 350cc 200 Mile Solo race
- 1927 – Manufacturing focuses on the more economical 344cc, 346cc and 488cc models (JAP engines) and production of the sleeve-value models (Barr & Stroud engines) ceased
- 1927 – Bill Lacey wins the 350cc Solo Championship, a Brooklands Gold Star award (Class C 500cc) on a 498cc Grindlay Peerless*
- 1928 – Grindlay Peerless 488cc model revised to 490cc and the Grindlay Peerless 677cc SV V-twin (JAP engine) and 172cc two-stroke engines (Villiers engine) released
- 1928 – Walter Hartley 'Wal' Phillips, nephew of Bert le Vack, wins the 350cc 200 Mile Solo race on a 346cc Grindlay Peerless
- 1928 – The first motorcycle race for women to be held of Brooklands is won by Miss Mae Ruffell (later Mrs. Lacey) on a Grindlay Peerless
- 1928 – Bill Lacey sets the 500cc one-hour World and British record and 103.3 miles on a modified 498cc Grindlay Peerless, and later wins the Lord Wakefield Cup with a speed of 107.1 mph
- 1928 – Bill Lacey sets new records for the flying-start kilometre sprint race in both the 350cc and 500cc classes at 104.12 mph and 112.16 mph respectively at the Arpajon Speed Trials
- 1929 – Grindlay Peerless 500cc 'Hundred' Model (JAP engine) model released
- 1929 – Bill Lacey wins the 50-miles handicap, the BMCRC 350cc Championship, and the 1000cc Championship (on his 498cc machine) at Brooklands on his Grindlay Peerless
- 1929 – Bill Lacey sets a new 500cc one-hour World and British record, raising the 'Classic Hour' to 105.87 mph, and wins a second Brooklands Gold Star award (Class B 350cc)*
- 1929 – Grindlay Peerless 490cc single OHV, 674cc single OHV and 750cc CV V-twin models (JAP engines) released
- 1930 – Grindlay Peerless 196cc and 247cc two-stroke (Villiers engines), 245cc OHV (JAP engine) and a number of variants of the 490cc OHV (JAP engine) models released
- 1931 – Production of all V-twin engine models ceases, while those with single JAP engines are retained temporarily before being replaced by Rudge-Whitworth Python engines for the 348cc and 499cc models
- 1931 – Wal Phillips wins at Brooklands on his Grindlay Peerless
- 1932 – Grindlay Peerless reduced their range of motorcycles to 3 models, the Tiger range, consisting of the light weight 250cc 'Tiger Cub', the mid range 499cc 'Tiger' and the top end 500cc 'Tiger Chief' and 'Tiger Chief TT' replica (Rudge-Whitworth engines)
- 1933 – Variants on the Grindlay Peerless Tiger range released
- 1934 – Grindlay Peerless limits motorcycle production and changes focus to other products
- 1936 – Edmond Joseph 'Boy' Tubb wins a Brooklands Gold Star award (Class C 500cc) on a Grindlay Peerless 'Hundred Model'*
- 1939 – Grindlay and Peerless part company

*awarded for a rider's first 100 plus mph lap in a given class

== British and World Records ==
CWG 'Bill' Lacey became the first man to exceed a 100 miles in an hour on British soil in August 1928 aboard his modified 498cc Grindlay Peerless. The bike covered 103.3 miles, or 103 miles and 532 yards, in the hour at Brooklands racing circuit in Surrey to secure a Fédération Internationale de Motocyclisme (FIM) world record, the British record, and a new Class record.

In 1929, Bill Lacey broke the record again on his Grindlay Peerless, by covering 105.87 miles in the hour at Autodrome de Linasc-Montlhéry, Montlhéry, in France. Lacey took the record for a third time in Montlhéry in 1931 covering, 111.45 miles in the hour, but this time atop a Norton motorcycle.

These successes resulted in Grindlay Peerless releasing a replica 'Hundred' Model for the consumer market.

== Products and development ==
=== Motorcycles ===
Over the course of its 16-year history, Grindlay Peerless produced a number of different models, many of which allowed for a degree of customisation. The range included variants of the 175cc, 250cc, 350cc, 500cc, 680cc, 750cc, and 999cc models, with options for different valves, ports, engines, and finishes.

==== The 'Hundred' Model ====
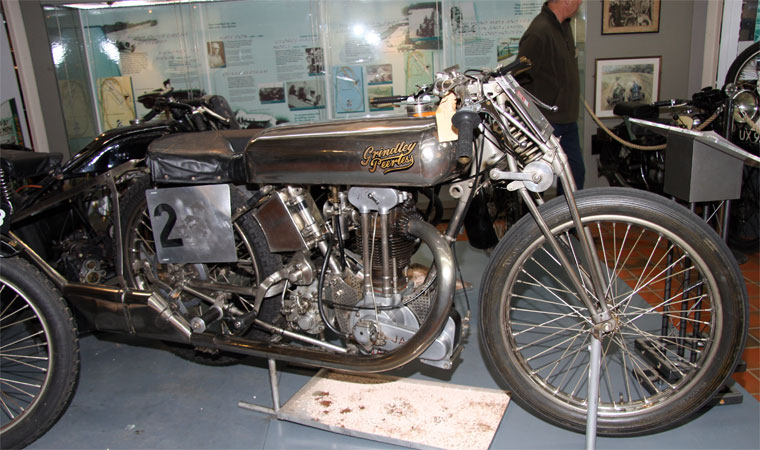
1929 Grindlay Peerless JAP 500cc 'Hundred Model', Brooklands Museum, Surrey

Following Bill Lacey's record beating ride in 1928, Grindlay Peerless created a small number of replica motorcycles for sale to the public, namely the 1929 Grindlay Peerless JAP 500cc 'Hundred' Model or 'Lacey Replica'. The 500cc 'Hundred' model had JAP speedway engines and Webb forks as opposed to Lacey's personally tuned, twin-port engine and Brompton forks, however each motorcycle was individually tuned by Lacey's own mechanic, Walter Hartley 'Wal' Phillips, and sold with a certificate guaranteeing Lacey had personally lapped the machine at Brooklands at 100 mph.

Of the 6 replicas produced only 1 or 2 are known to have survived, one of which, specifically the model belonging to the prominent Vintage Motor Cycle Club member, the late Edmond Joseph 'Boy' Tubb, who won his Brooklands Gold Star aboard the Grindlay, sold at Bonhams auction house for GBP £67,580 (USD $108,165) in 2012, and as of 2014 remains one of the most expensive motorcycles sold at auction.

==== Technological Advances ====
Grindlay Peerless adopted the use of sleeve-valve motors, a type of four-stroke engine more frequently used to power early aircraft, rather than the traditional side-valve engine, meaning that pushrods, valve springs, rockers and cams were no longer required. This valve system allowed for the spark plug to be repositioned for maximum efficiency, and required far less maintenance than a side-valve engine.

=== Sidecars ===
Grindlay Peerless continued to produce sidecars under the Grindlay Sidecar name, and developed a range of designs to cater for all levels of comfort, speed, and price, including the club, Tourist (versions 1, 2, 3, and 4), Light Touring, Sports Superb, and Light Sporting models.

=== Coachwork ===
In 1918, Alfred Robert Grindlay established Grindlay Company or Grindlay (Coventry) Ltd, a sister company to Grindlay Peerless, which focused on coachwork and body kits for cars.

== War effort ==
Throughout WWI, Musson & Grindlay and Coventry Motor & Sundries provided key materials for the armament and munitions industry in Coventry.

Similarly, during WWII, another sister company to Grindlay Peerless under Alfred Robert Grindlay and his sons, namely Coventry Engineering Company founded in 1936, assisted with the production of aircraft guns, pitch propellers, barrage balloons, aircraft fuselages, and control gear.

== Gallery ==
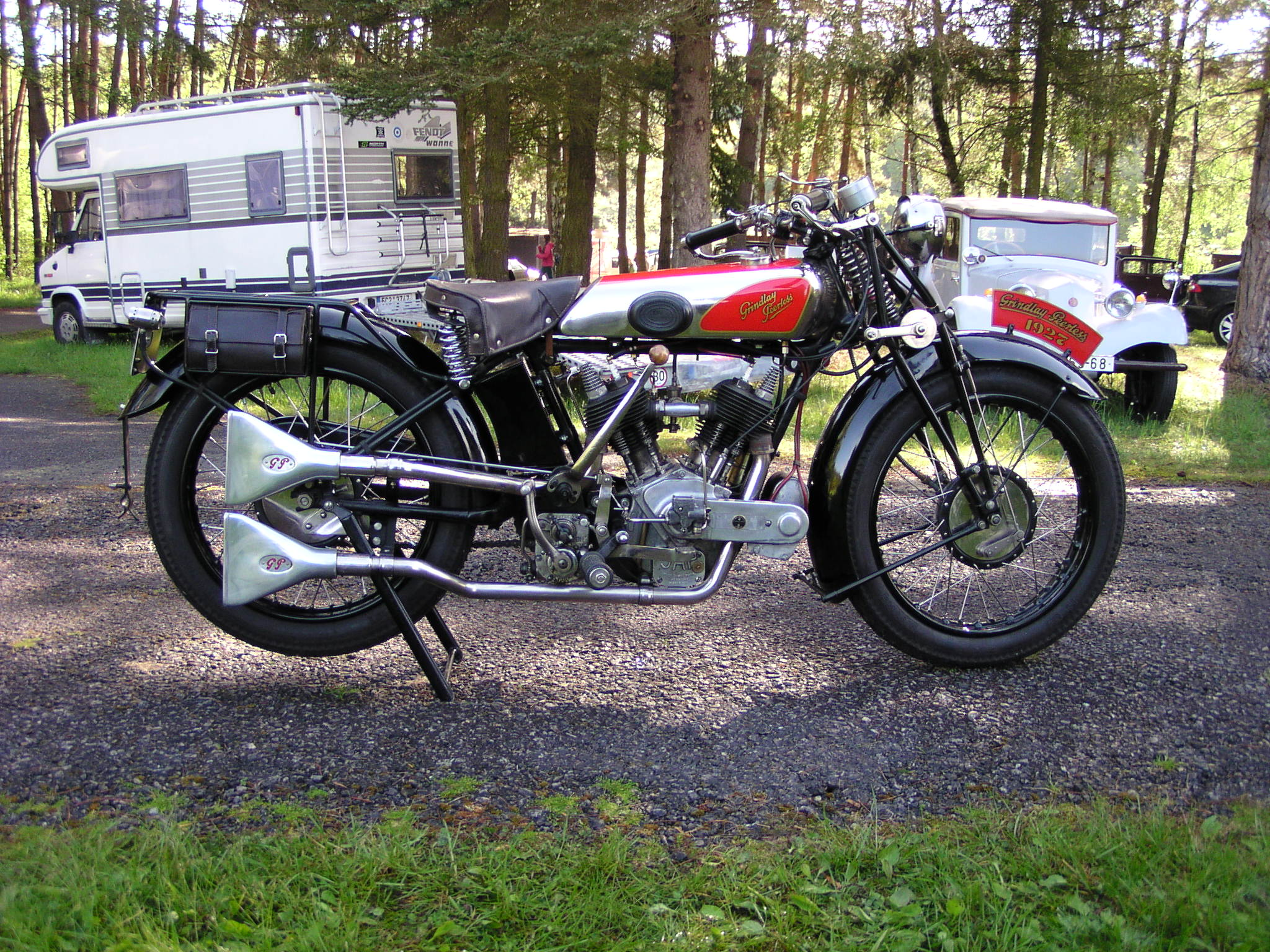
1927 Grindlay Peerless

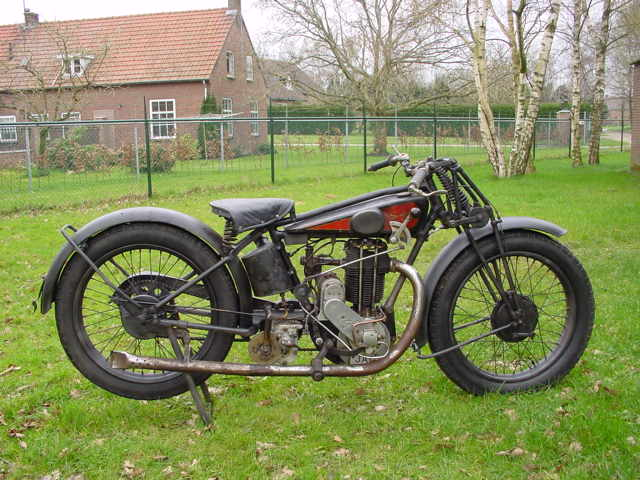
1926 Grindlay Peerless

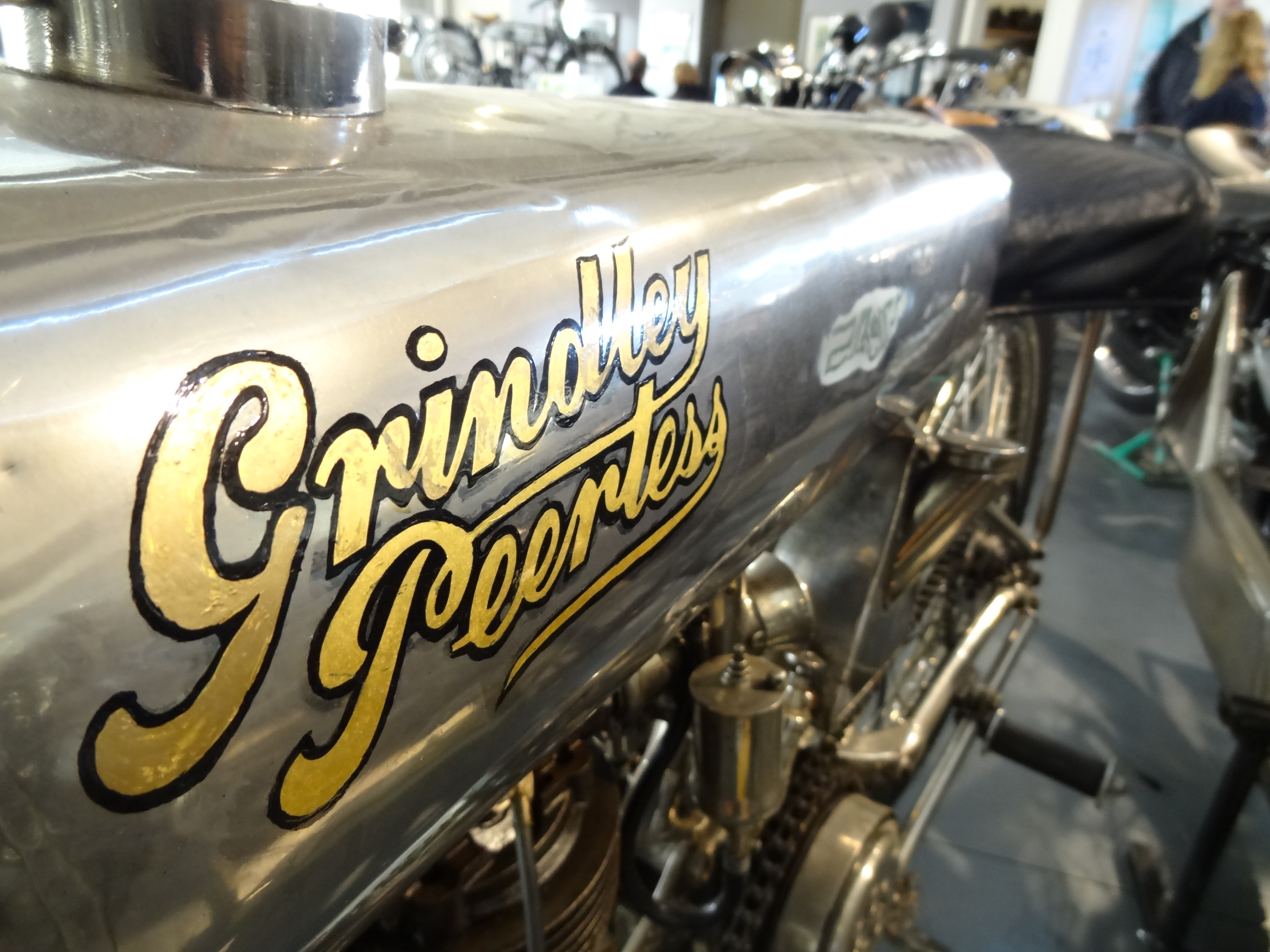
Grindlay Peerless 'Hundred' Model, featuring the renowned spelling mistake 'Grindley' on the tank

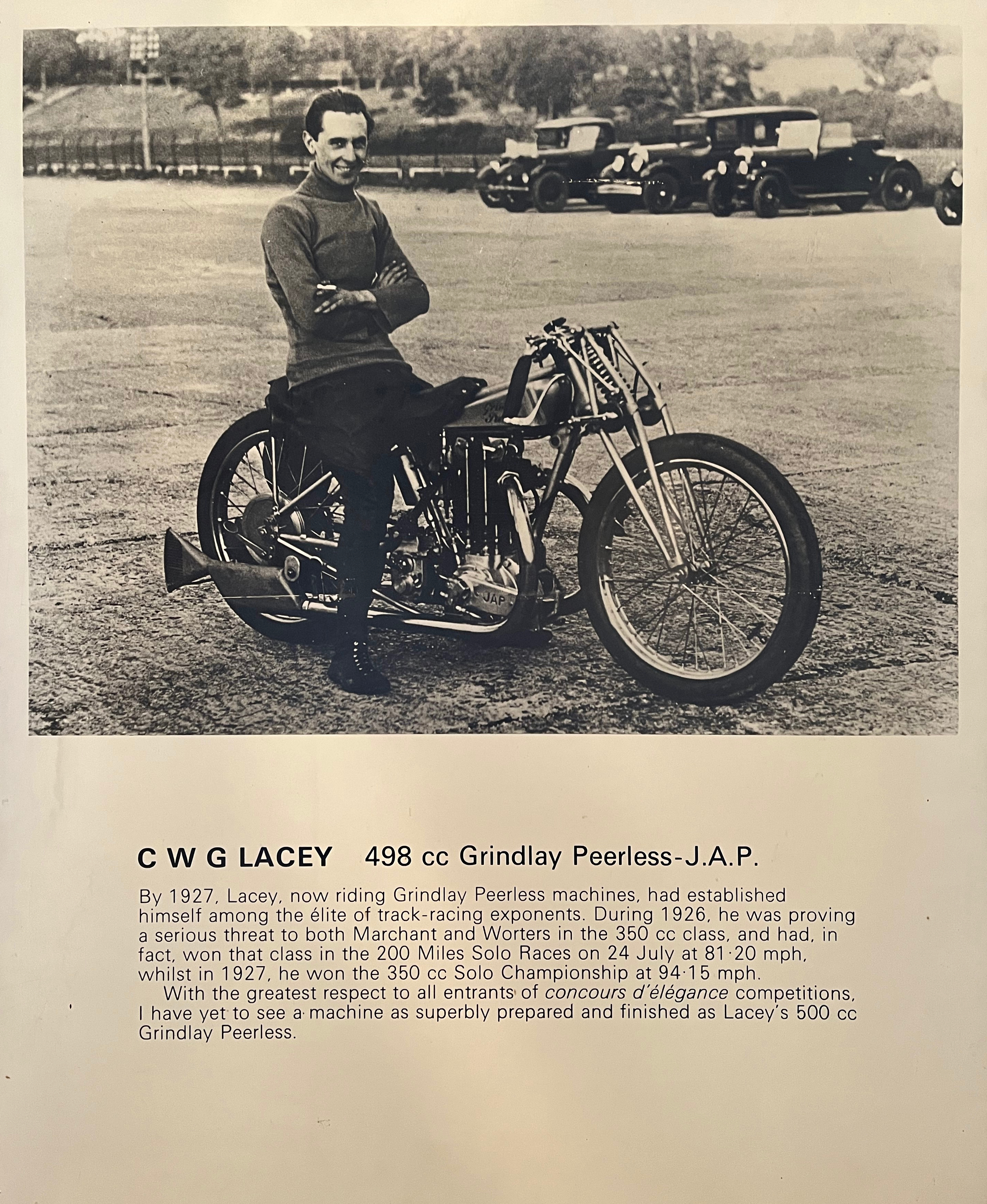
CWG 'Bill' Lacey with his 498cc Grindlay Peerless JAP, 1927

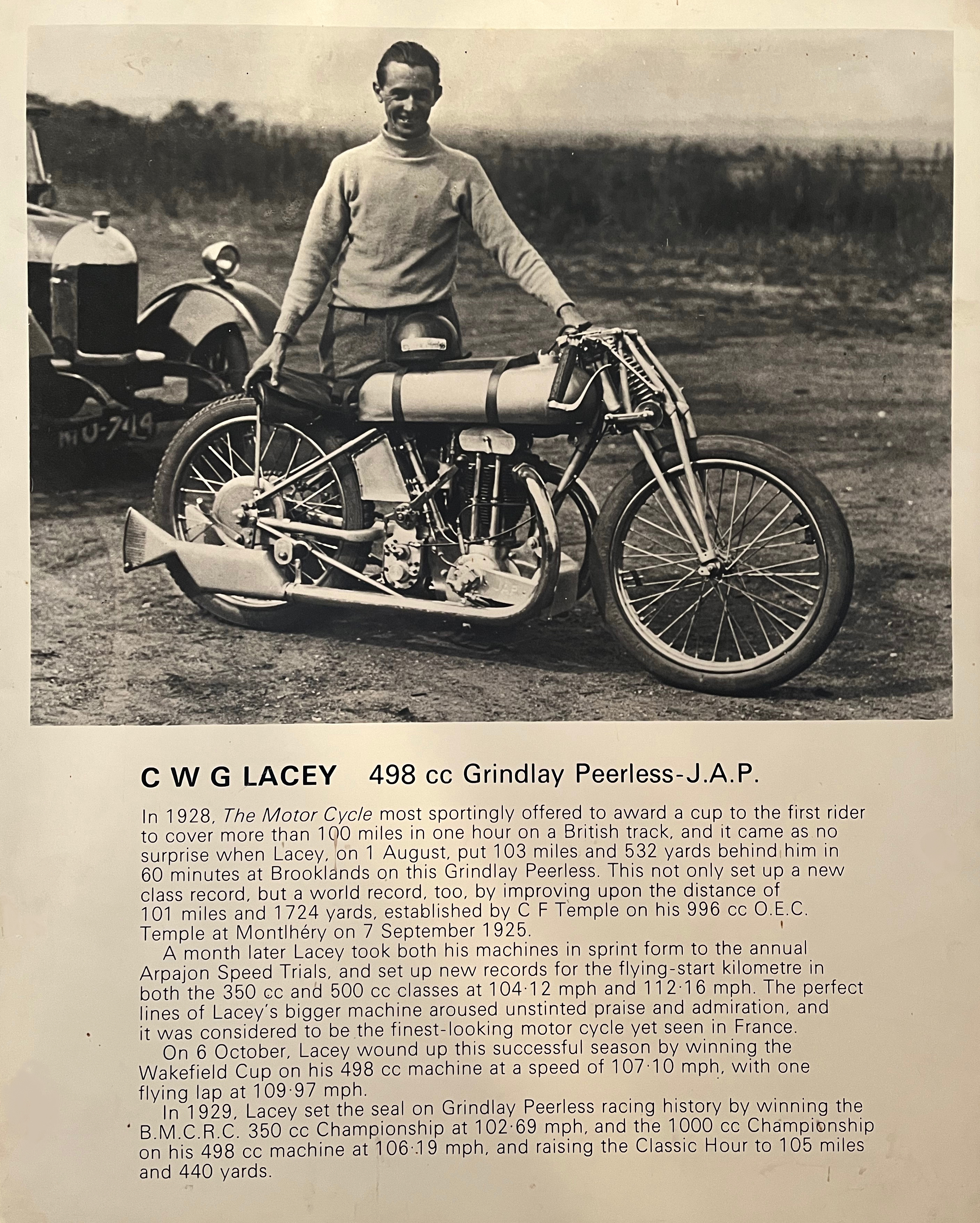
CWG 'Bill' Lacey with his 498cc Grindlay Peerless JAP, 1928

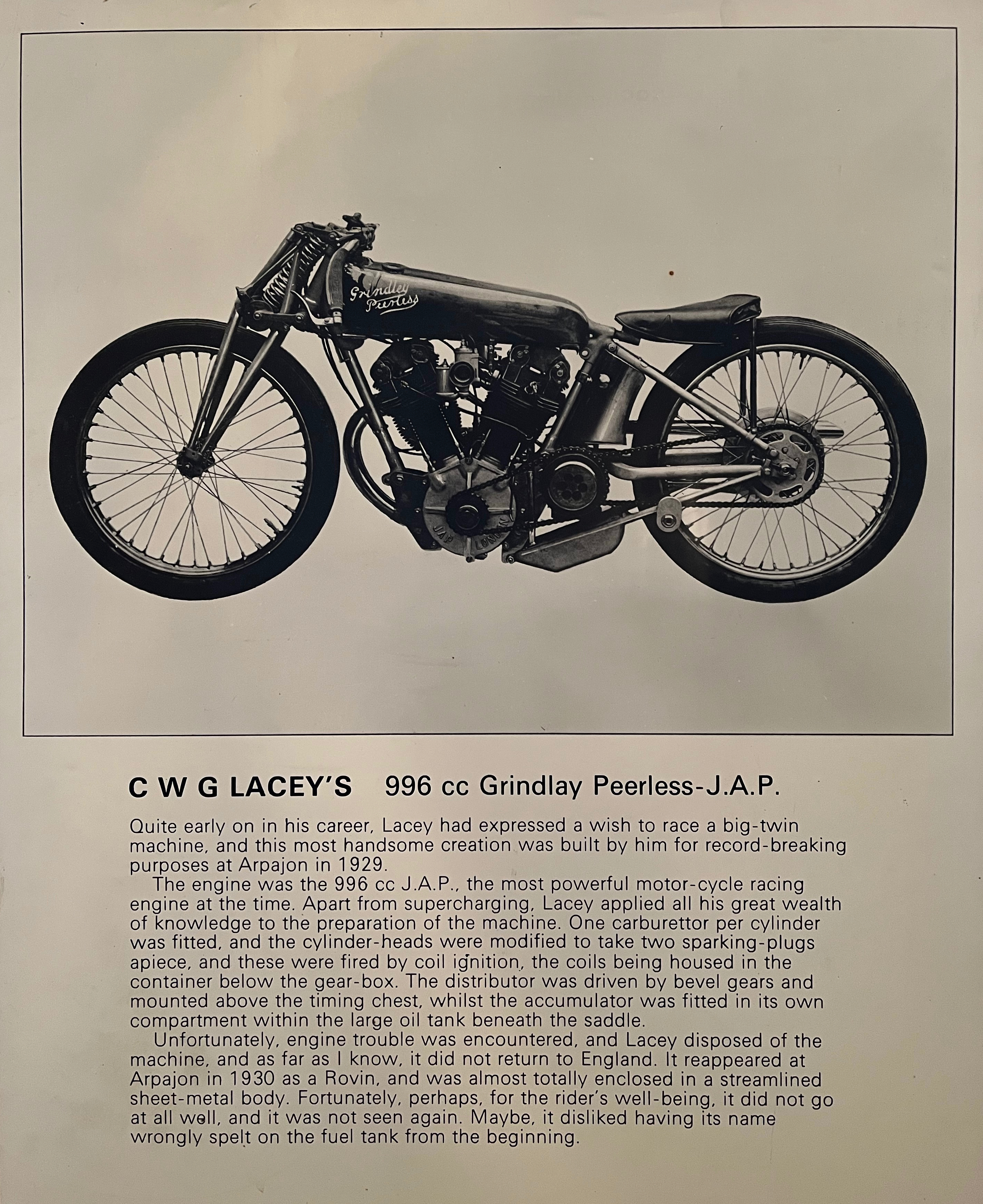
The 996cc Grindlay Peerless JAP

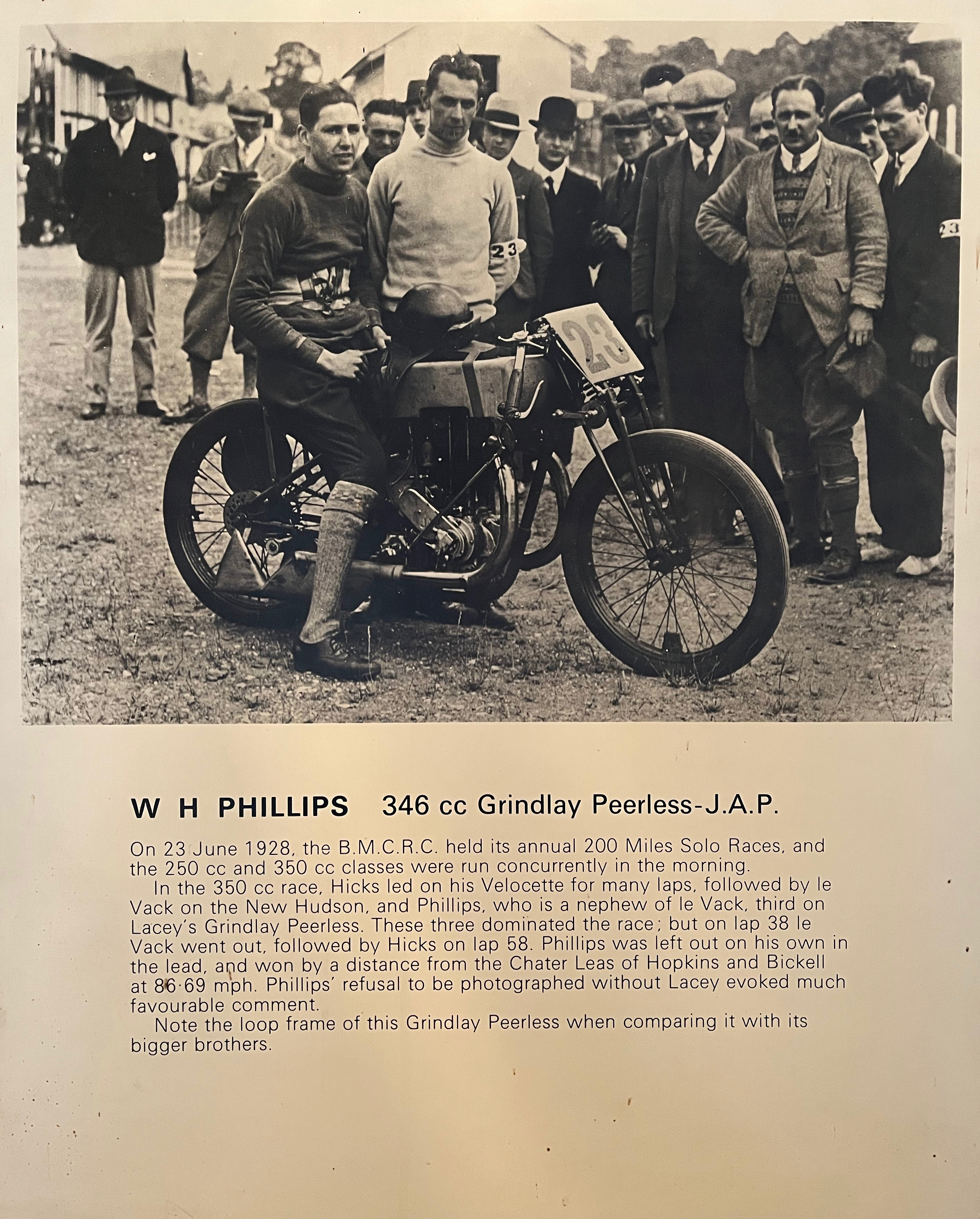
WH 'Wal' Phillips on his 346cc Grindlay Peerless JAP, 1928

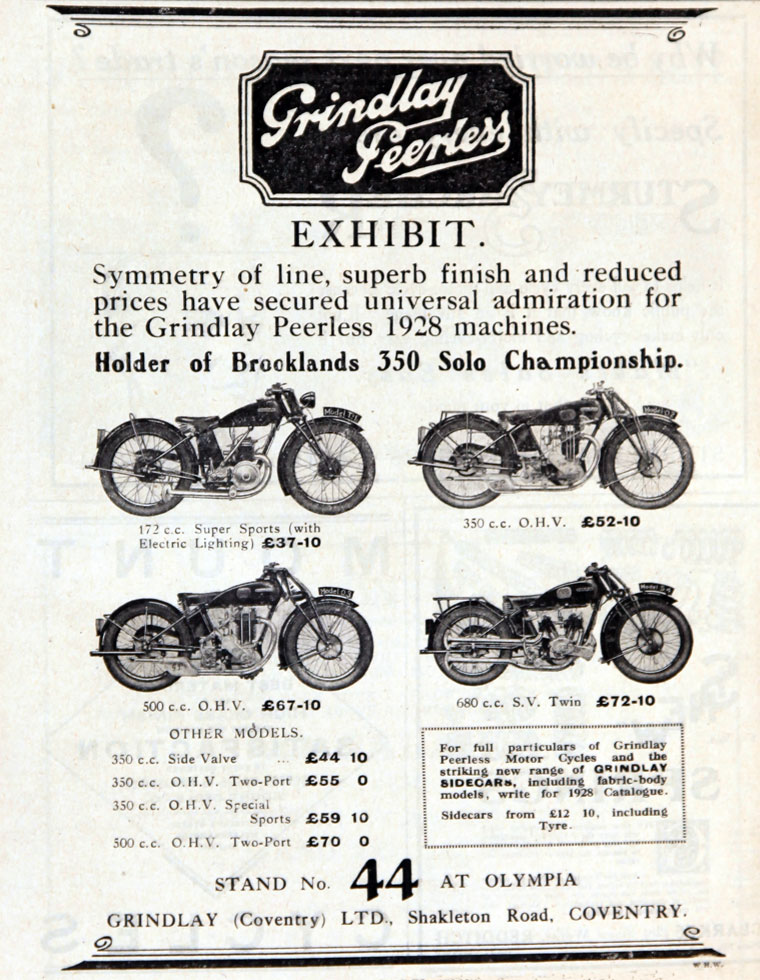
Grindlay Peerless advertisement, November 1927

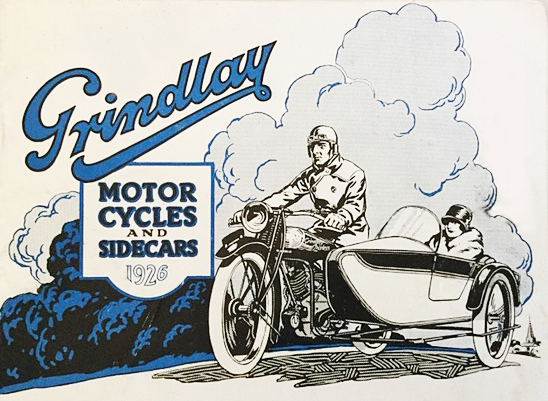
Grindlay Peerless catalogue, 1926

== See also ==
- List of Grindlay Peerless people
- Alfred Robert Grindlay
- Historic Coventry
