= VMCC =

VMCC may refer to:

- Vintage Motor Cycle Club, a motorcycle club
- Valley of the Moon Commute Club, a California bus service
