= Ann Rollason =

- Born: 1760
- Died: 1846 (aged 85–86)
- Occupation: publisher
- Known for: Publishing the Coventry Mercury
- Spouse: Noah

Ann Rollason (1760s – 1846) was a printer and bookseller who published the Coventry Mercury from 1813 to her death.

== Life ==
Ann was born in 1768 or 1769, and had at least three siblings. She married the owner of the Coventry Mercury and they had four children, Ann Pearson in 1803, Charles Aris Noah in 1804, Jane Eleanor Honora in 1807) and Sophia in 1811. Her husband, Noah Rollason, died in 1813. He had been the lead and owner of the Coventry Mercury newspaper which he re-titled the Coventry Mercury, and the Warwickshire, Northamptonshire, Leicestershire and Oxfordshire general Advertiser. This was similar to its original title when it was first published in 1741.

Ann had been involved in managing the business, but when she became a widow, she was allowed to both own and control the activity. One of the partners William Reader was particularly useful. He had been her husband's apprentice and he had become a partner in 1808 and he and others assisted. Reader was retained as a manager when their partnership agreement ended in 1822. Ann did not choose to renew the partnership, but she instead relied more on her eldest son, Charles, who had been in the business since 1820. Reader was interested in history, topography and Coventry, but he had financial problems and he left Coventry in 1835.

Ann did not just run the business she inherited, but she expanded it considerably. She had a shop in the High Street, the printing business and a stamp office in Grey Friars Lane and outside the city she bought property at Grey Friars Greem. She was distributing stamps, organising printing and the newspaper and the shop was a stationers selling magazines, books and medicines.

By the time she died her estate was worth £14,000. She left the business to her son, but the seat was split between all of her children.
