= Emily Smith (mayor) =

Mayor of Coventry

Emily Smith was Mayor of Coventry between 1942 and 1943, during World War II and the latter part of the Coventry Blitz. She served as a Poor Law Guardian, Labour Councillor, magistrate and alderman.

== Life and early career ==
Emily Smith was born Emily Parker in Dudley Hill and Tong, Bradford. In 1915 she moved from Bradford to Coventry. After her husband's death four years later, she brought up their children by herself.

Smith served as a Labour councillor in Coventry from 1928.

In 1933 Smith argued against the requirement for women officers in Coventry City Council to resign upon marriage. She became an alderman in 1937.

== Mayor of Coventry ==
On 9 November 1942 Smith was elected Mayor of Coventry, the second woman ever to hold the post. She said that:

“for it to be possible for a working woman to become mayor of this ancient city [...] speaks highly for our democracy.”

On 23 February 1943 Smith formally opened Canley Garden Cemetery and Crematorium.

In 1943, following the Battle of Stalingrad, Smith led a project with women of Coventry to send an embroidered tablecloth as a message of sympathy to women in Stalingrad. More than 800 women signed their names on the cloth, which was later embroidered by Mrs May Adams. People paid six pence each to sign and the donations were sent to Stalingrad along with the cloth. In 1944 a "bond of friendship" was created between Coventry and Stalingrad in one of the earliest recorded examples of city twinning.

Reflecting on her mayoral year in 1943, Smith said that “All I wanted to be [was] a good mother to the citizens”
