= Vintage Motor Cycle Club =

UK-based vintage motorcycle club

Vintage Motor Cycle Club Limited
- Founded: 1946
- Founder: Charles Edmund 'Titch' Allen (1915–2010) OBE, BEM
- Headquarters: Staffordshire, United Kingdom

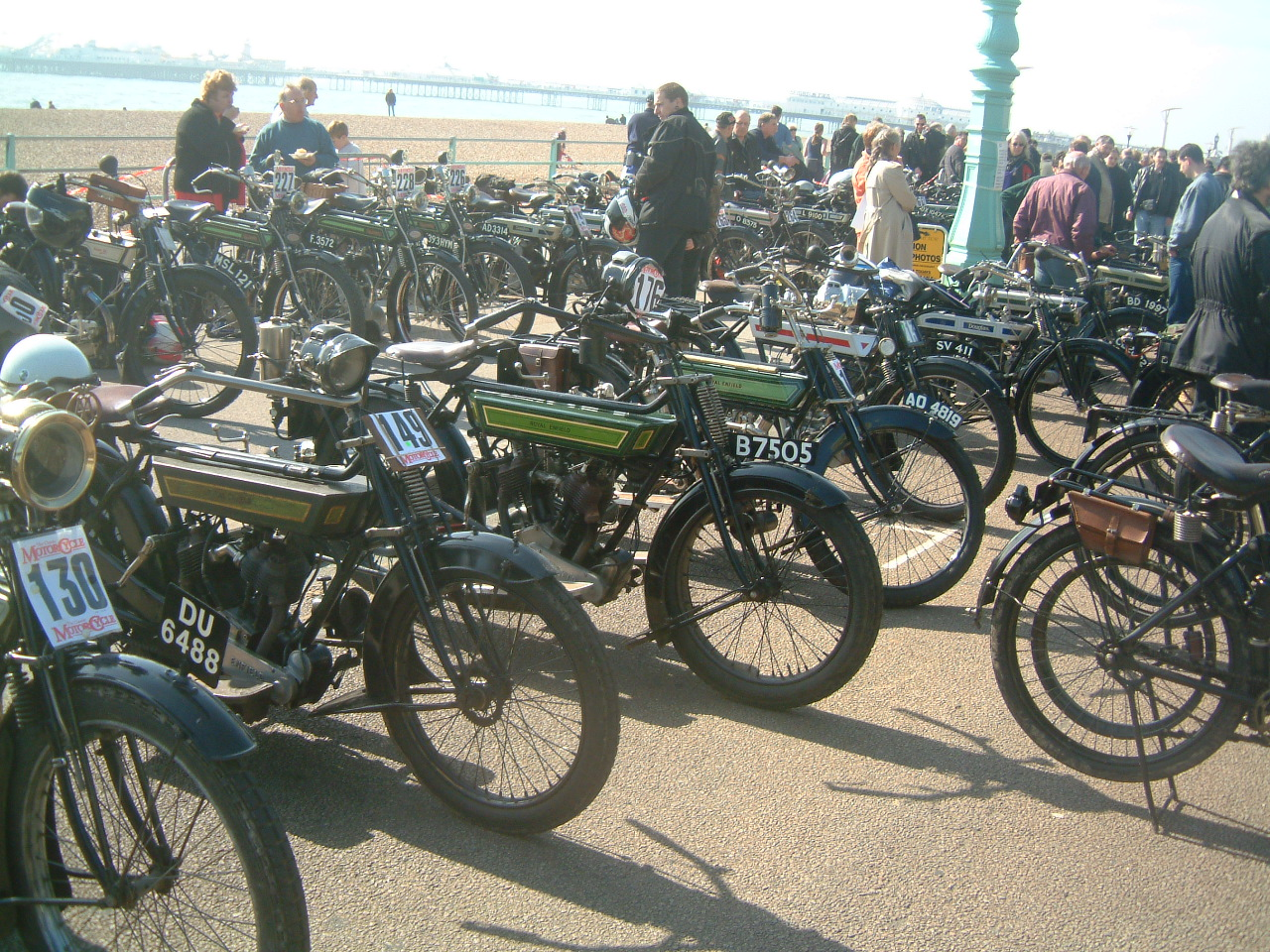
A vintage motorcycle rally in Brighton

The Vintage Motor Cycle Club (VMCC) is a UK-based vintage motorcycle club with over 10,000 members, which aims to promote and preserve all makes of motorcycles over 25 years old.

== History ==
The Vintage Motor Cycle Club was founded on 28 April 1946, by 38 enthusiasts at the Lounge Cafe, Hog's Back, near Guildford in Surrey, for owners of motorcycles manufactured before December 1930.

Many of the founders rode to the first meeting on vintage motorcycles and had travelled from around the country in poor weather conditions. The first meeting had been organised by former journalist and wartime despatch rider, the late 'Titch' Allen, with the aim of promoting the use and preservation of vintage motorcycles manufactured prior to 31 December 1930. The club's activities have expanded over the years to include rallies, hill climbs, trials, a workshop and museum, a library, a sales and wants system for spares and motorcycles, insurance for difficult cases and an annual dinner.

== VMCC today ==
All makes are catered for regardless of the country of origin. The VMCC has also broadened the 1930 rule to include all motorcycles over 25 years old and has also set up a Post-1960 Section for motorcycle manufactured between 1961 and 1981. Most significantly, it is no longer necessary to own a motorcycle to join the club, which has developed into an organisation for anyone interested in older two-wheelers.

The club's head office is at Allen House in Burton upon Trent, Staffordshire. Current membership is over 10,000. The club has been organised into regional sections, most of which have at least one club night each month.

== VMCC library ==
The VMCC library holds original British motorcycle factory records for Triumph, BSA, Norton, Ariel, Scott, Levis and Royal Enfield being the largest collection of motorcycle-related paperwork in the world.

It is also a DVLA recognised body for age related motorcycle registration numbers. The collection includes catalogues, handbooks, spare parts lists, runs of The Motor Cycle and Motor Cycling magazines, as well as other motorcycle magazines and books from the 1880s to the present day. The library also has a comprehensive collection of photographs of motorcycles, riders and events.

== See also ==
- Outline of motorcycles and motorcycling
