= All Saints Church, Allesley =

Church in Coventry, West Midlands, England

All Saints Church
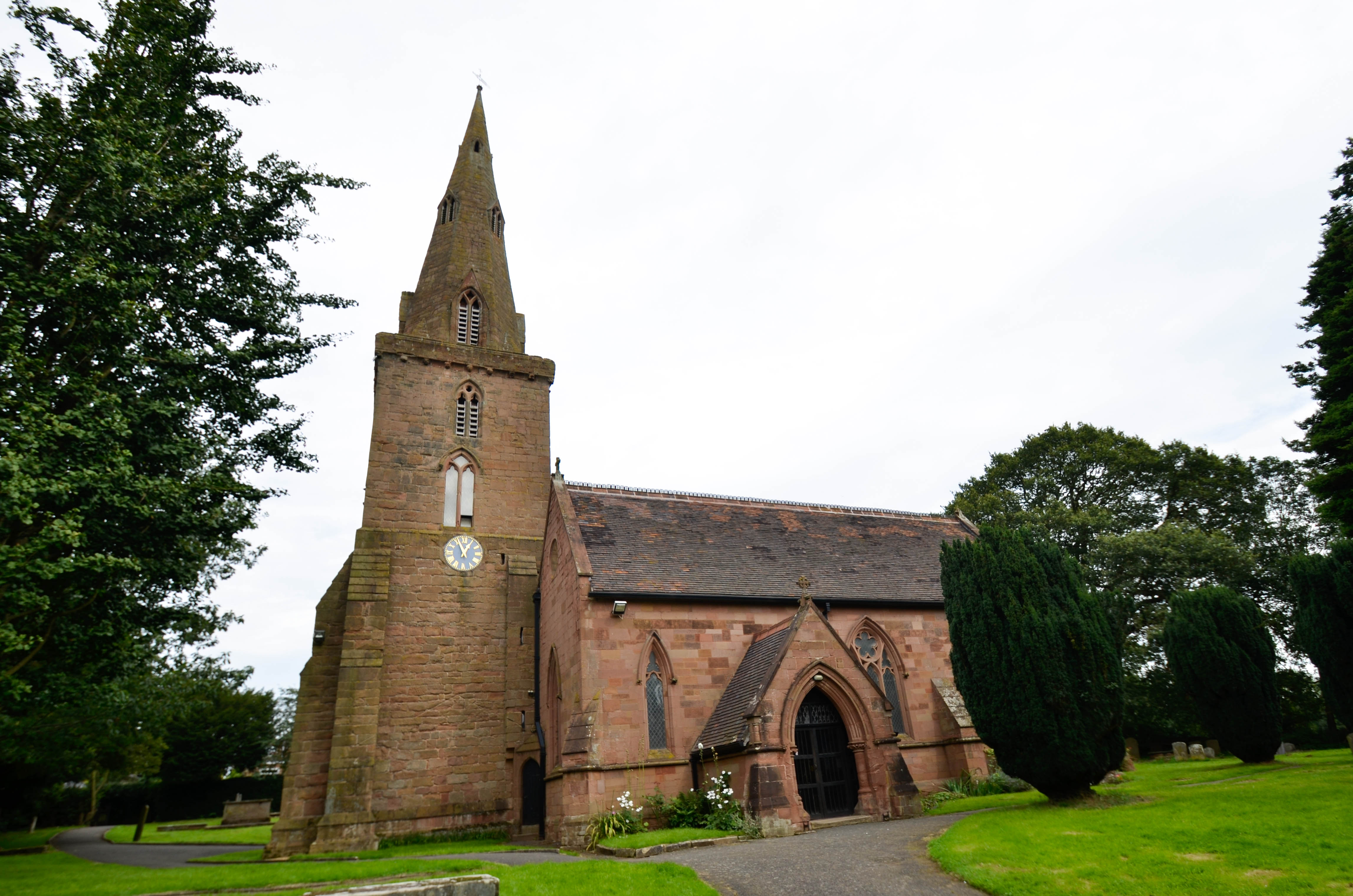

- Location within West Midlands county

General information
- Status: Grade I listed
- Location: Coventry, England
- Coordinates: 52°25′23″N 1°33′27″W
- Completed: 13th century

All Saints Church is a medieval church in the village of Allesley in the West Midlands County, England. The building is grade I.

The church is thought to be 13th century in origin, but has a history dating back to Norman times and was largely rebuilt in 1862–3 by James Murray. The building contains many wall monuments, dating to the 17th and 18th centuries, particularly in the vestry and under the tower. Further additions were made in the 19th century.

== See also ==
- Grade I listed buildings in Coventry
