= Allesley =

Village and civil parish in Coventry, West Midlands County, England

Coordinates: 52°25′N 1°33′W

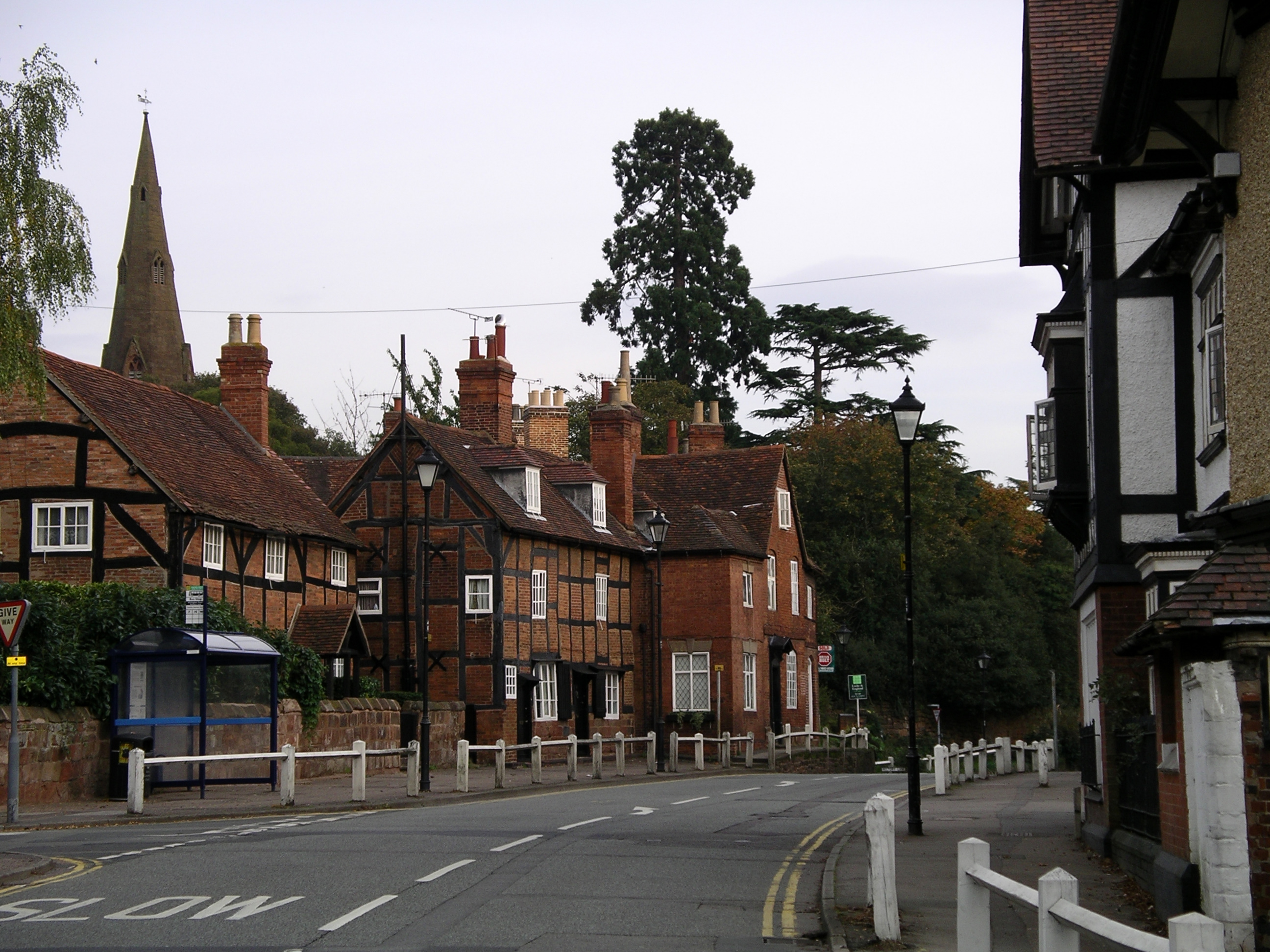
- The old village

- Location within the West Midlands
- Population: 907 (2021 census)
- OS grid reference: SP 297 807
- Civil parish: Allesley
- Metropolitan borough: Coventry
- Metropolitan county: West Midlands
- Region: West Midlands
- Country: England
- Sovereign state: United Kingdom
- Post town: Coventry
- Postcode district: CV5
- Dialling code: 024
- Police: West Midlands
- Fire: West Midlands
- Ambulance: West Midlands

Allesley (/ˈɔːlzli/) is a suburban village and civil parish in the City of Coventry metropolitan borough, West Midlands. It is about 3.5 miles (5.6 km) west-northwest of Coventry city centre and 4 miles (6.4 km) east-south-east of Meriden, historically in the Arden area of Warwickshire. The parish population as of the 2021 census was 907. Until 1998, Allesley contained the main Jaguar car assembly plant at Browns Lane.

== Geography ==
Situated at the eastern extreme of the Meriden Gap, the parish of Allesley covers a much larger area than the village itself, which is based around Washbrook Lane, Browns Lane and Hawkesmill Lane. The parish incorporates the ancient rural Ardens of Pinketts Booth, Pickford, Pickford Green, Harvest Hill, Hawkes End, Hollyberry End, Wall Hill and Brownshill Green.

Allesley Village denotes the area east of the Birmingham Road, including West Point. Although this is largely a dormitory community for Coventry, it retains several aspects of a separate village, with many residents still regarding it as such. Most of the old village is a conservation area on a low ridge between the River Sherbourne and a tributary of it, the Pickford Brook.

The suburbs of Allesley Green and Allesley Park lie outside the parish to the south and east. Allesley Park developed in the 1950s to 1970s to the east of the A45 and due south of Allesley. Allesley Green, built in the late 1980s, lies a quarter of a mile south-west of Allesley. The combined population of the three is approximately 8,000.

== History ==
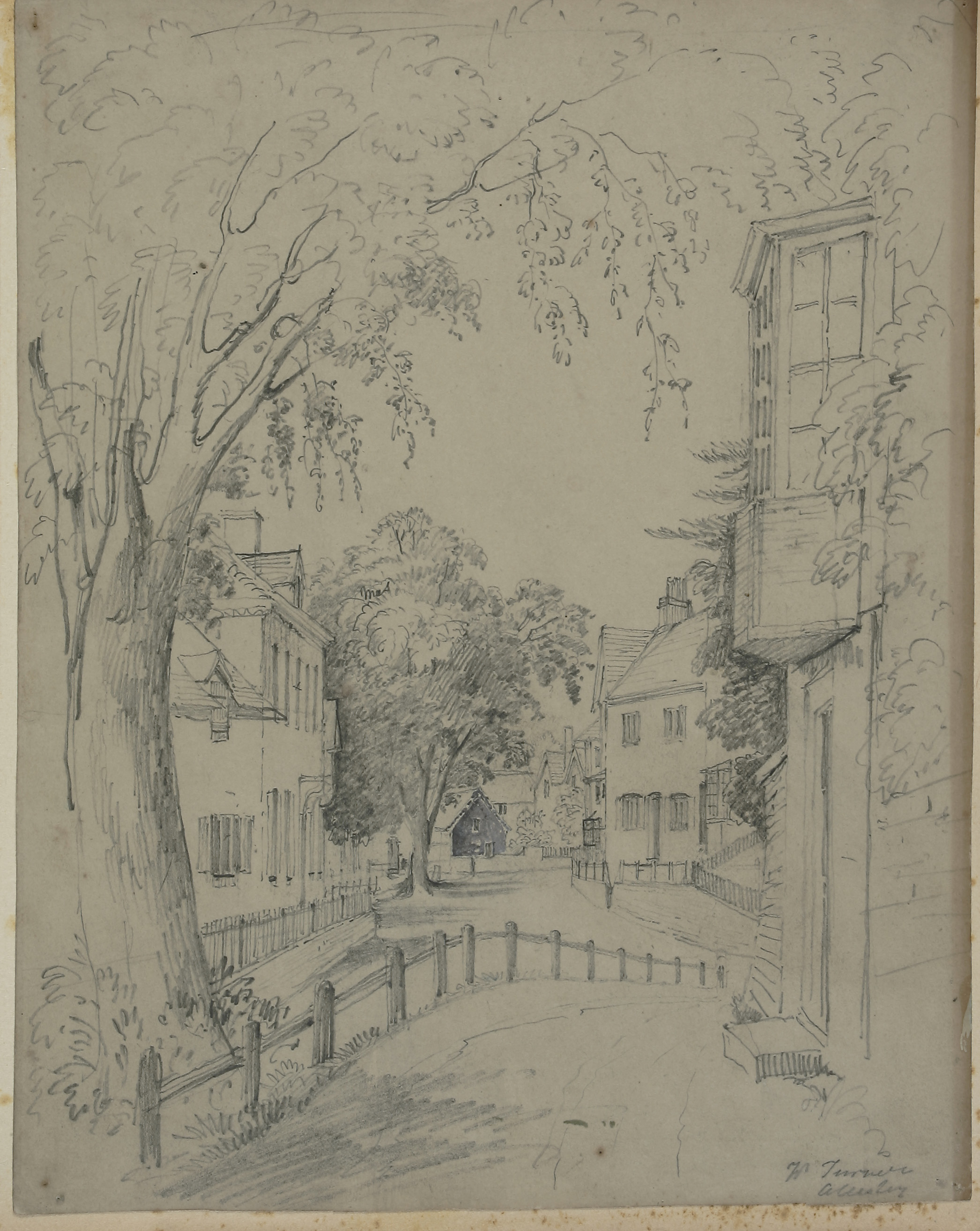
Allesley in 1828/9, by Samuel Rostill Lines

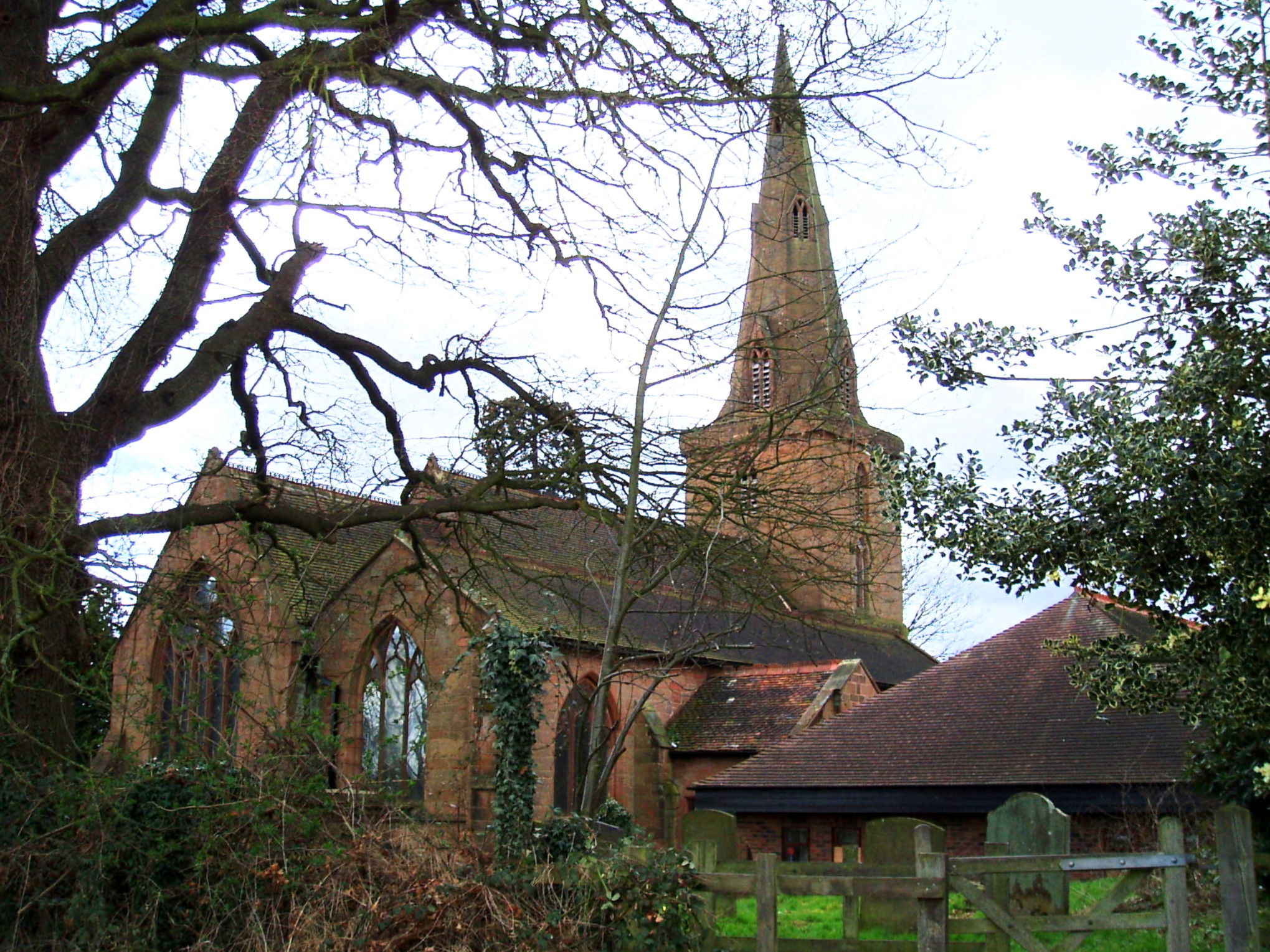
All Saints Church

Allesley grew around the 800-year-old All Saints Church (known as All Souls Church until the Reformation). Its spire is prominent on the village skyline. Originating about 1140, it was rebuilt in 1863 and remains largely unaltered since. A noted writer on husbandry, Walter Blith, was baptised there on 7 August 1605. Next to the Church is The Elms, Coventry, a former private residence, eye hospital and children's convalescent home, which is now a pub and restaurant operated by the Harvester chain.

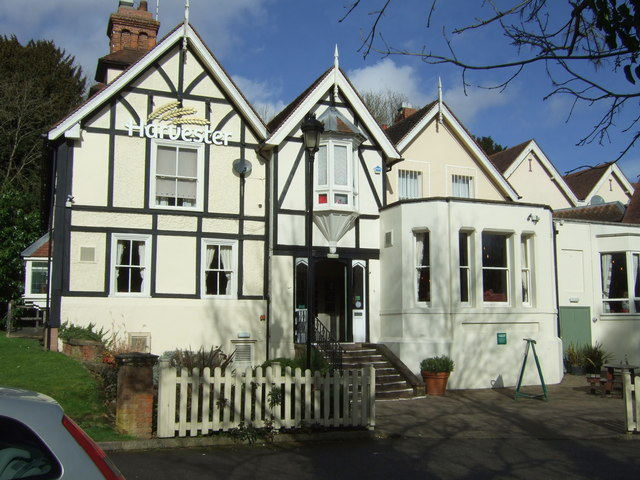
The Elms, Coventry

The Birmingham Road running through the village was part of the turnpike trunk road laid out between Holyhead and London in 1821–1824 by Thomas Telford. Allesley Toll House was built at the junction of Holyhead Road and Allesley Old Road. It was rare in that it allowed payment to be taken on two roads simultaneously. Tolls were discontinued under the Annual Turnpike Acts Continuance Act 1871. The toll house was demolished in the mid-1930s.

Allesley included the Browns Lane Jaguar car plant and its national showroom, which closed in the late 1990s. Wood-veneer trim production for Jaguar continued until the mid-2000s, after which the land was sold to developers. An Amazon fulfilment centre opened on the site in 2018.

== Demographics ==
Census population of Allesley parish
Census	Population	Female	Male	Households	Source
2001	805	424	381	293	
2011	837	440	397	318	
2021	907	461	446	328	

== Twin town ==
Allesley is twinned with the village of Saint-Jean-Soleymieux, near Saint-Étienne, Loire, France.

== Sports ==
The parish has an amateur Barkers Butts Rugby Football Club playing at the Bob Coward Memorial Ground, just off Pickford Grange Lane. Formed in 1946, it originally played in Keresley, but moved to Allesley in 1975.
