= Coventry War Memorial =

War memorial in Coventry, England

Coordinates: 52.393803°N 1.518665°W

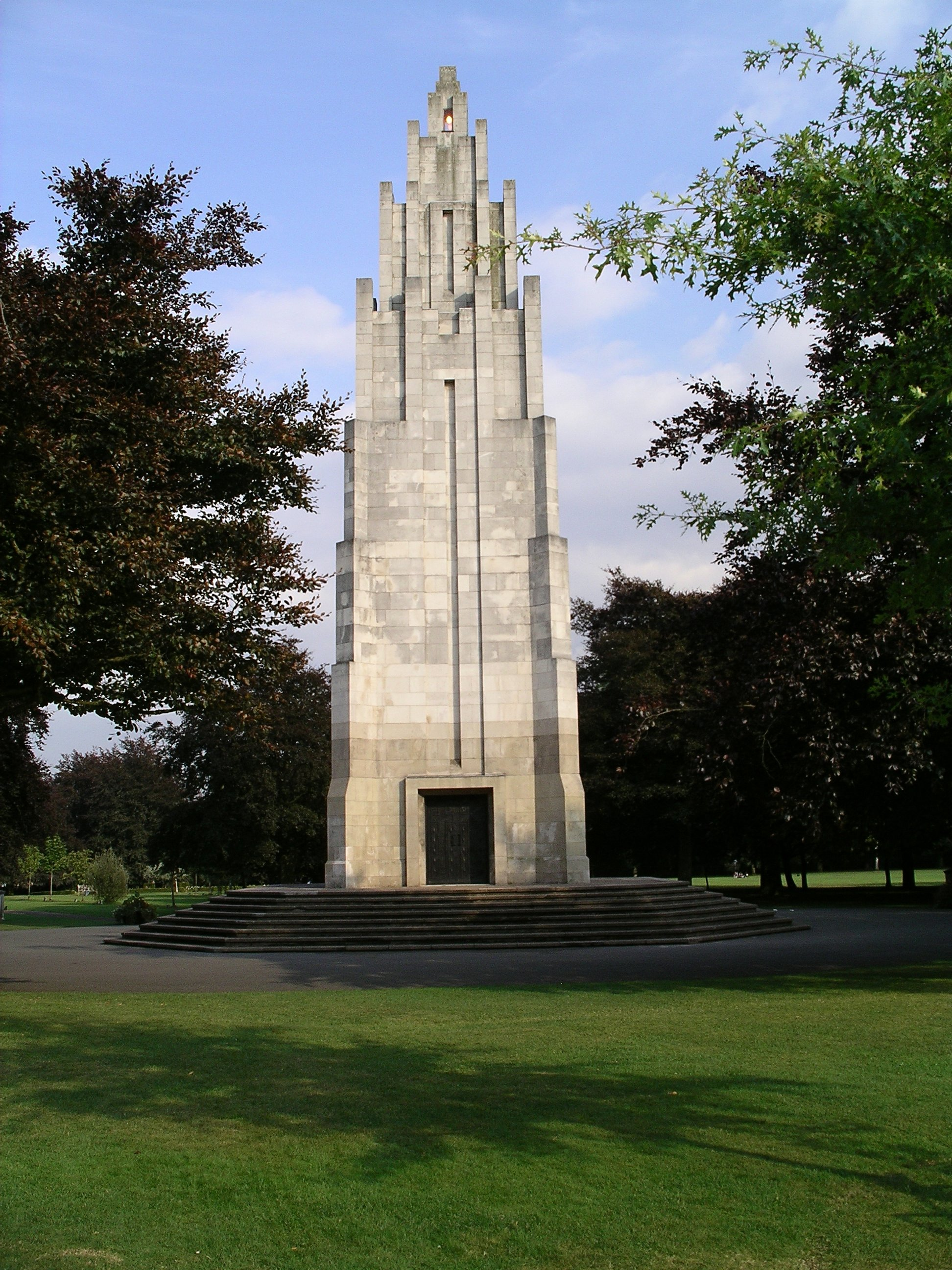

Coventry War Memorial stands at the centre of War Memorial Park, to the south of the city of Coventry in England. The memorial is a tapering tower 87 feet (27 m) high, completed in 1927. It was restored in 2011, and designated as a Grade II* listed building in January 2013. At the same time, the park was itself listed at Grade II, and the gates and gate posts at the park's main entrance were separately Grade II listed.

== Background ==
Coventry City Council formed a war memorial committee in 1919 to develop proposals to commemorate the 2,587 Coventrians who died in the First World War. The committee determined that the creation of a public park would be a suitable memorial, and raised £31,000 to acquire a site at Stivichall on the south side of the city from Hon Alexander Frederick Gregory, son of Samuel Hood-Tibbits, 3rd Viscount Hood, on the high ground between the River Sherbourne and the River Sowe. The 120 acres (49 ha) park opened in 1921, with a formal area to the northeast and a separate informal area to the southwest with playing fields. The park was designed with avenues leading away from a monument on the high ground at the centre of the park, along which copper beech trees were planted as memorials in 1925. Over 200 trees were planted, many with an individual bronze plaque on a stone plinth. The trees in the park included at least one Verdun oak. Further avenues of memorial trees were planted after the Second World War.

Due to inadequate budgets, and attention devoted to other issues such as housing, Coventry was one of the last major British cities to complete its First World War memorial (the Liverpool Cenotaph and the Bristol Cenotaph came later, in 1930 and 1932 respectively). The Coventry war memorial committee sought designs from architects in 1923, and selected a tower designed by local architect Thomas Francis Tickner. Tickner died in 1924, soon after his design was selected, but another local architect Thomas Reginald John Meakin oversaw the construction. The necessary funds of £5,000 were raised from a public appeal that commenced in 1924. The tower was built by a local builder, John Gray of Coombe Abbey, and who also built the Courtaulds works at Foleshill.

== Description ==
Construction of the memorial tower began in 1925 and it was completed in 1927. It was built using reinforced concrete and clad with Portland stone, in Art Deco style with Classical details. It has a square section, and originally stood on a stepped octagonal stone platform, replaced in 2011 with a circular platform of granite with eight steps, handrails and a ramp. The corners are heavily buttressed and step back in ten tiers with blunt pinnacles, reaching a summit which has an eternal light. Stone pedestals near the corners of the memorial, constructed in 1928, conceal floodlights.

The north elevation has a tall stone cross sculpted in relief, above a sculpted wreath and the dates of the two World Wars, "1914-1918" and "1939-1945", a relief sculpture depicting the arms of the city of Coventry, and a shelf for floral tributes. The south elevation also has a tall cross sculpted in relief and a shelf for tributes. The platform bears bronze discs commemorating men of Coventry awarded the Victoria Cross, including Charles Parker (Boer War), and Arthur Hutt, Henry Tandy, William Beesley, and Alfred Edward Sephton (all First World War). A separate bronze plaque bears a quotation from Laurence Binyon's poem "For the Fallen".

Openings on the east and west elevations provide access to a chamber within, with large bronze doors added in 1928 which bear relief sculptures of a cross and the dates "1914-1918" and "1939-1945". The Chamber of Silence inside the tower contains a roll of honour listing the fallen, and other memorials, including memorials to the Old Contemptibles and to the workers of Renold Chains. The roll was later extended to include the fallen from the Second World (817 in the armed forces, 115 in civilian defence organisations, and 1085 civilians) and in subsequent conflicts, such as the Gulf War. The Chamber is opened to the public on Remembrance Sunday each year.

The memorial was dedicated by Field Marshal Douglas Haig, 1st Earl Haig, at a ceremony held on 8 October 1927. The party accompanying Earl Haig included the Mayor of Coventry, as well as Mrs E Bench whose four sons were killed in the war, and Corporal Hutt VC.

The memorial as rededicated after the Second World War by Bernard Montgomery, 1st Viscount Montgomery of Alamein. The park and the tower were restored in 2011 with funding from the Heritage Lottery Fund and the Big Lottery Fund, and the tower was rededicated again in October 2011 by the Bishop of Coventry, Christopher Cocksworth. On 17 July 2014, in a ceremony performed by Prince William, Duke of Cambridge, the Memorial Park was the first of 500 parks to be dedicated as a Centenary Field.

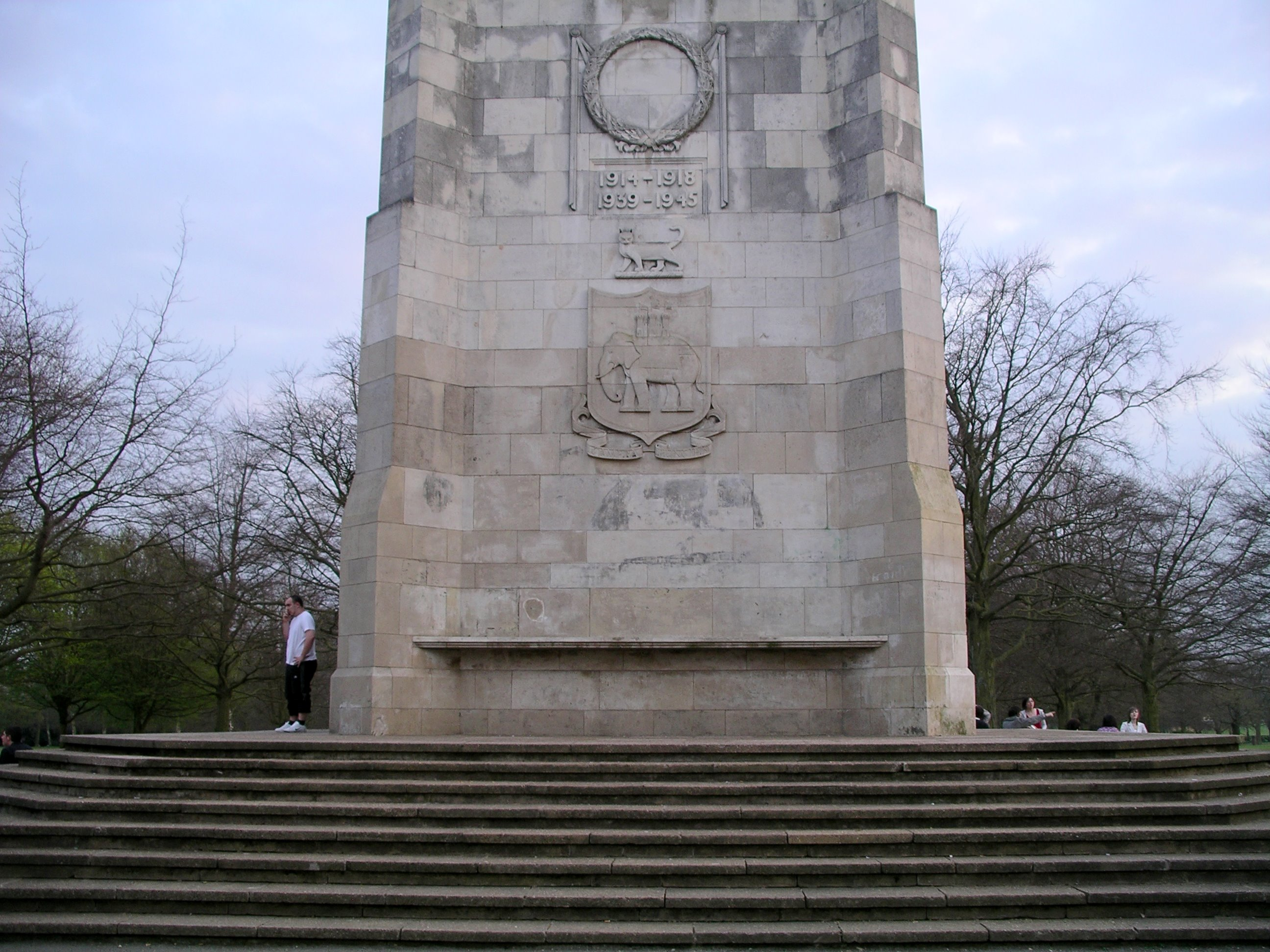

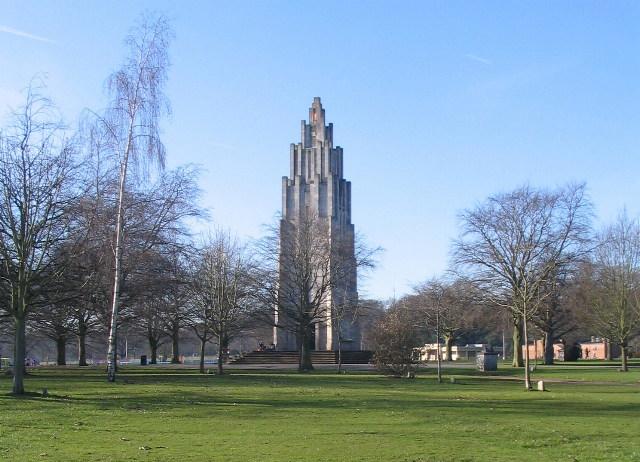

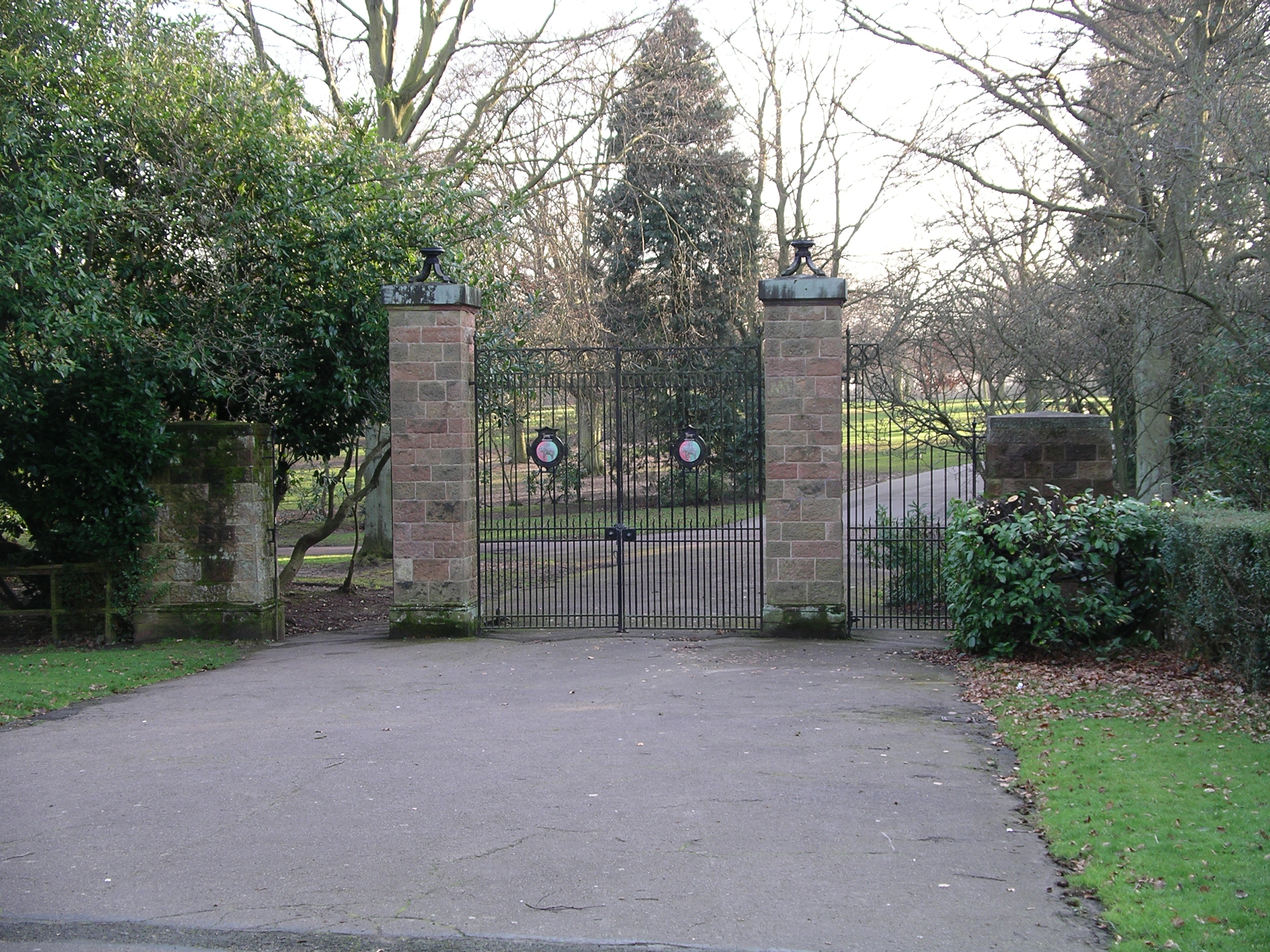

== See also ==
- Grade II* listed buildings in Coventry
- Grade II* listed war memorials in England
