= Coat of arms (disambiguation) =

A coat of arms is a heraldic visual design on an escutcheon, surcoat, or tabard, originating in Europe.

Coat of arms may also refer to:

- Coat of Arms (Sabaton album), 2010
- Coat of Arms (Wishbone Ash album), 2020
- Coat of Arms (radio play), a 1937 Australian radio play by Alexander Turner

== See also ==
- Coat of Arms Bridge, a railway bridge in Coventry, England
