= Cat bin woman incident =

2010 viral video and criminal case

Cat Bin Woman incident
- Date: August 21, 2010 (16 years ago)
- Location: Coventry, England, United Kingdom
- Also known as: Cat Bin Lady
- Motive: Unknown
- Sentence: Fined £250

On 21 August 2010, a woman was captured on CCTV dropping a cat into a wheelie bin on a residential street in Coventry, England. The cat was recovered alive from the bin 15 hours later by its owners. The footage went viral online and resulted in significant public backlash against the woman, dubbed as the Cat Bin Woman, who was later identified as Mary Bale and fined £250 for causing unnecessary suffering to an animal.

== Incident ==
Stephanie Andrews-Mann and her husband Darryl Mann, who lived in Stoke Heath, Coventry, had installed a CCTV camera on the front of their house after their car had been damaged by careless drivers. On 21 August 2010, the camera recorded a woman approaching and petting their 4-year-old tabby cat Lola on the front wall of their property. The woman then grabbed the cat by the scruff of the neck and dropped her into their wheelie bin, before closing the lid and walking away. The cat was discovered alive in the bin 15 hours later, after her owners heard the cat meowing, and the CCTV recording was found. Darryl Mann published the footage online with the intention of identifying the perpetrator, and the video quickly went viral online. The woman in the video was later identified as 45-year-old Mary Bale.

== Reactions ==
The CCTV footage of the incident elicited strong reactions from the general public and was widely covered in both British and international media. A YouGov poll held less than a week after the incident indicated that 84% of respondents believed that Bale should be prosecuted for animal cruelty, and just 9% believed she should not be charged.

Bale also received multiple death threats which resulted in police community support officers being stationed outside her house, and Facebook removed a page which called for her death. The cat's owners reported that they were "stunned" by the extent of the public reaction and urged people not to take matters into their own hands.

The incident was also the subject of parody videos, and Twitter accounts were created which variously claimed to be either Mary Bale or Lola the cat. Tabloid newspaper The Sun also created an online game called "Whack-Cat-Woman" in which players were encouraged to trap Bale inside bins.

== Criminal charges against her ==
The incident was investigated by the RSPCA with the support of West Midlands Police, but the police initially said that Bale had not committed a criminal offence. Bale was later taken to court by the RSPCA, where she pleaded guilty to causing unnecessary suffering to a cat, for which she was fined £250 and ordered to pay costs of £1,171. She was also prohibited from owning animals for 5 years. District Judge Caroline Goulborn acknowledged that Bale had been under significant stress, having visited her critically ill father in hospital just 10 days before the incident, but added that it was "no excuse for what you did". By the time she was convicted, her father had died. The court was also told that she had since suffered from anxiety and depression which had forced her to resign from her job as a bank clerk. Her extensive public vilification was also taken into account, with the profound mental health impact to not be understated.

A YouGov poll held after the trial indicated that 54% of people believed that Bale received the right punishment for her actions and 14% believed her punishment to be too harsh, while 29% believed it was not harsh enough.

Although initially dismissive of the negative reactions to the incident, saying "I don’t know what all the fuss is about, it’s just a cat", Bale later expressed regret for what she called a "moment of madness". Flustered, she also told reporters "I don’t know what came over me, but I suddenly thought it would be funny. I never thought it would be trapped. Cats are good climbers and I assumed it would just scramble out."
