= Arthur Hutt =

Arthur Hutt VC
- Born: 12 February 1889; Earlsdon, Coventry
- Died: 14 April 1954 (aged 65); Coventry
- Military career
- Allegiance: United Kingdom
- Branch: British Army
- Service years: 1909 - 1919
- Rank: Corporal
- Units: Royal Warwickshire Regiment
- Conflicts: World War I; Battle of Passchendaele; Battle of Broodseinde
- Awards: Victoria Cross

Arthur Hutt VC (12 February 1889 – 14 April 1954) was an English recipient of the Victoria Cross, the highest and most prestigious award for gallantry in the face of the enemy that can be awarded to British and Commonwealth forces. He was the first person born in Coventry to be awarded the Victoria Cross

== Details ==
He was 28 years old, and a private in the 1/7th Battalion of The Royal Warwickshire Regiment, British Army during the First World War when the following deed took place at the battle of Passchendaele for which he was awarded the VC.

On 4 October 1917, at Terrier Farm, south-east of Poelcapelle, during the advance on the villages of Poelcapelle and Passchendaele, Belgium, when all the officers and NCOs of No. 2 Platoon had become casualties, Private Hutt took command of and led the platoon. He was held up by a strong post but immediately ran forward alone and shot the officer and three men in the post; between 40 and 50 others surrendered. Later, having pushed too far, he withdrew his party, covering them by sniping the enemy, and then carried back a wounded man to shelter. After he had consolidated his position, he then went out and carried in four more wounded under heavy fire.

== Further information ==
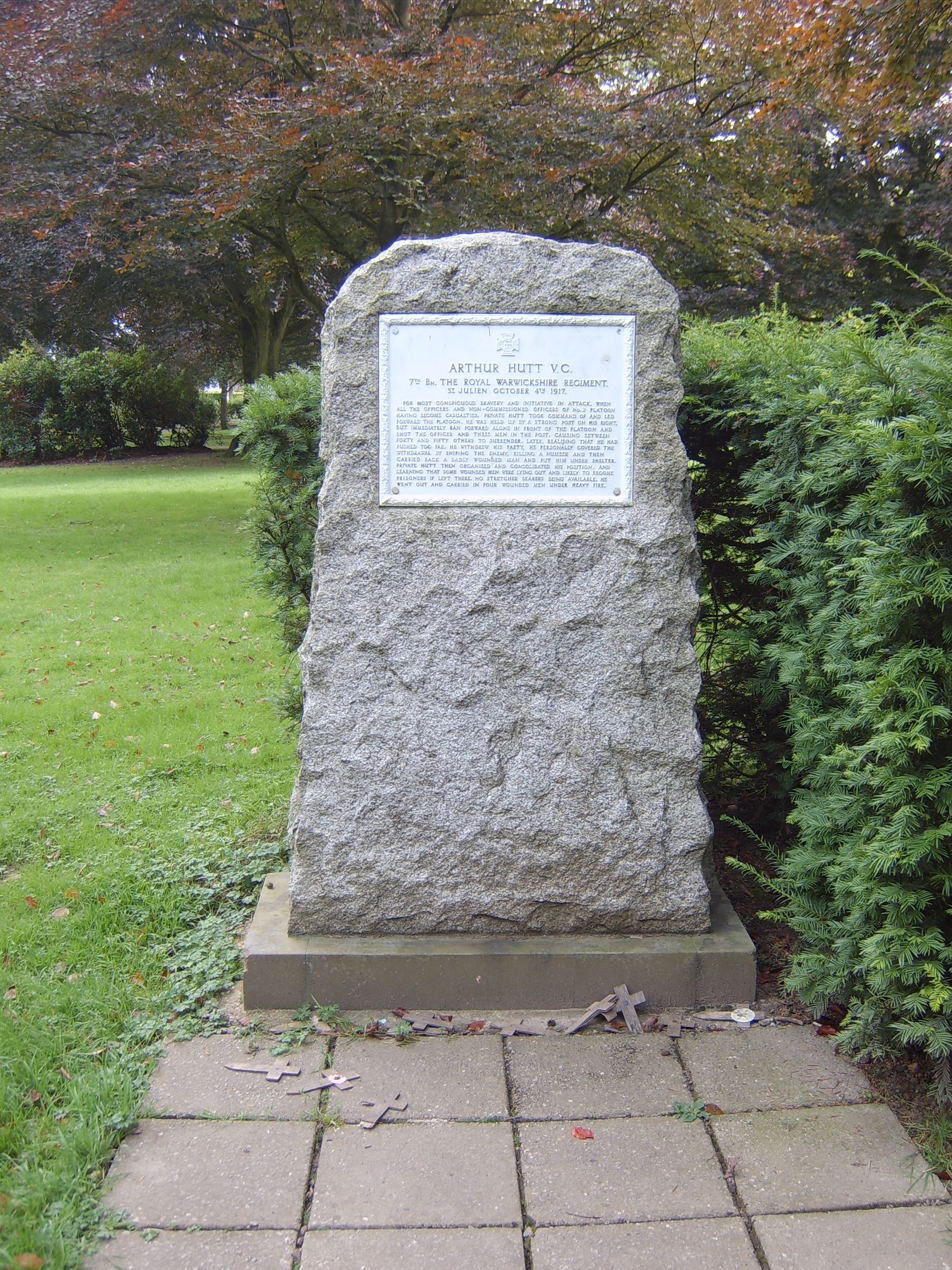
Memorial to Arthur Hutt, War Memorial Park, Coventry

He later achieved the rank of corporal. He is commemorated with a Cornish granite memorial in War Memorial Park, Coventry.

On Wednesday 4 October 2017 a commemorative V.C. Paving stone was lay for Cpl Arthur Hutt at the War Memorial Park in Coventry. The address was given by Reverend Greg Bartlem (vicar of Urban Hope Church, Coventry), and the unveiling was done by Deputy Lord Mayor, Councillor John Blundell. Other readings were also read out by Mr David Williams (great nephew), Mr D Rex, Mr J Waite (Nephew of Joseph (Joe) Waite M.M.) and one of the Lord Mayors Cadets.

== Bibliography ==
- Snelling, Stephen (2012) [1998]. Passchendaele 1917. VCs of the First World War. The History Press. ISBN 978-0752476667.
