= The Biggin Hall =

Public house in Coventry, England

Coordinates: 52.406978°N 1.471188°W

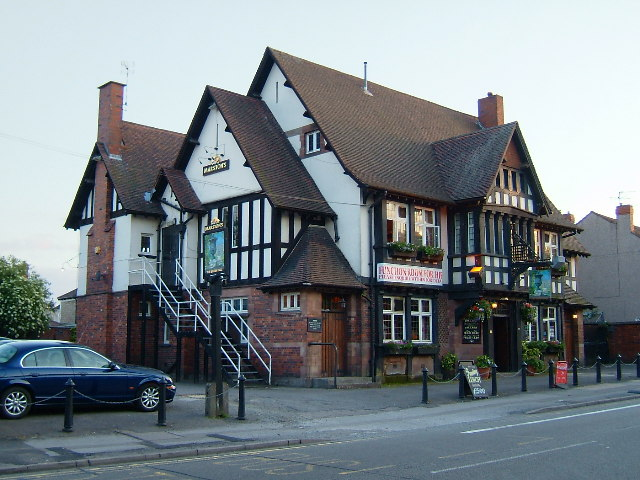
The Biggin Hall, 2005

The Biggin Hall Hotel is a Grade II listed public house at 214 Binley Road, Coventry, CV3 1HG.

It was built in 1921–1923 for Marston, Thompson & Evershed, and the architect was T. F. Tickner.

It was Grade II listed in 2015 by Historic England.
