= Courthouse Green =

Suburb in West Midlands, England

Coordinates: 52.427472°N 1.481892°W

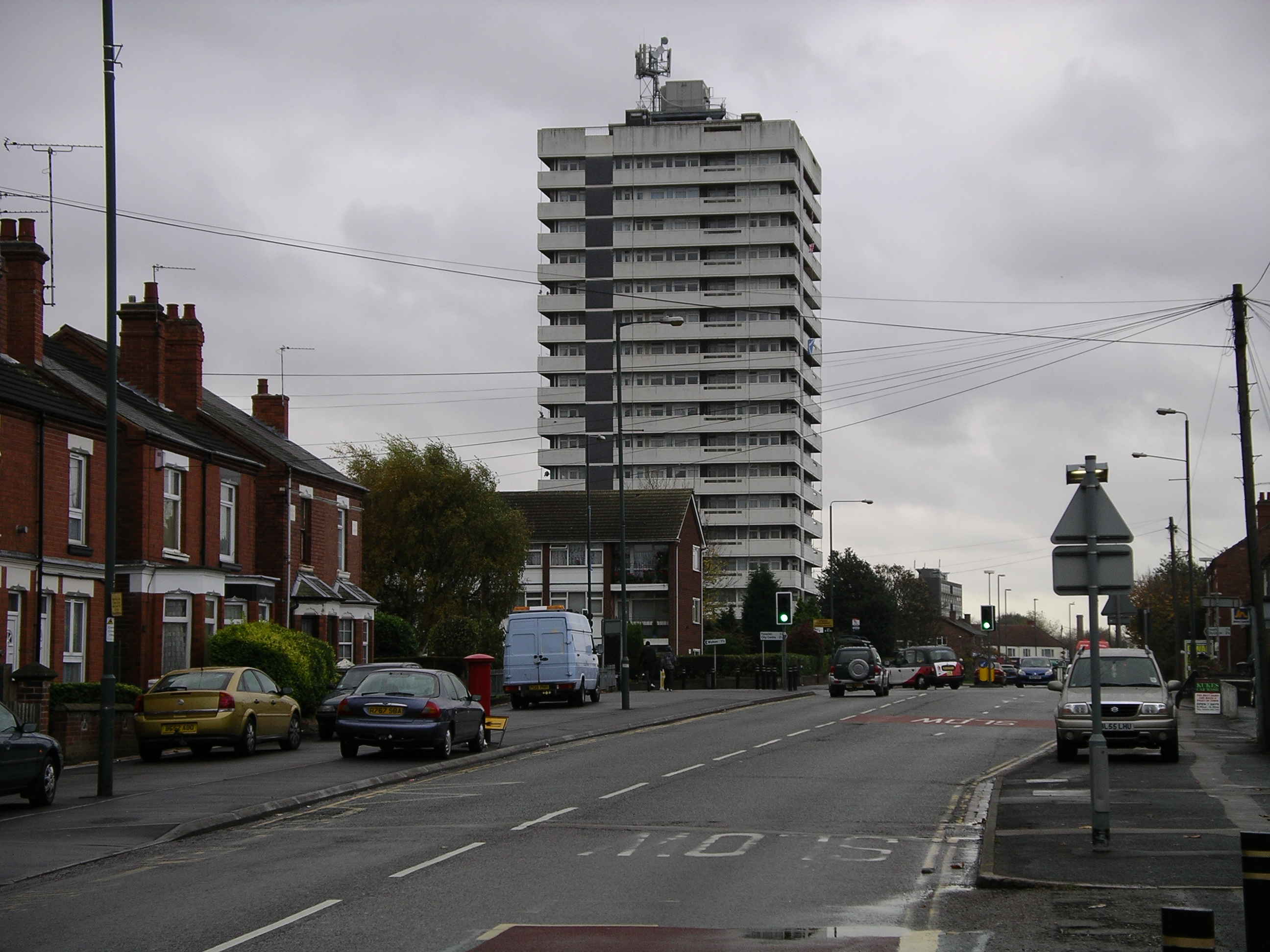
- Bell Green Road and Longfield House, Courthouse Green (view looking south).

- Location within the West Midlands
- Metropolitan county: West Midlands
- Region: West Midlands
- Country: England
- Sovereign state: United Kingdom

Courthouse Green is a suburb in the north of Coventry. It is bordered by Bell Green in the northwest, by Stoke Heath in the south, Wyken to the east, and by Foleshill in the southeast.

== Longfield House ==
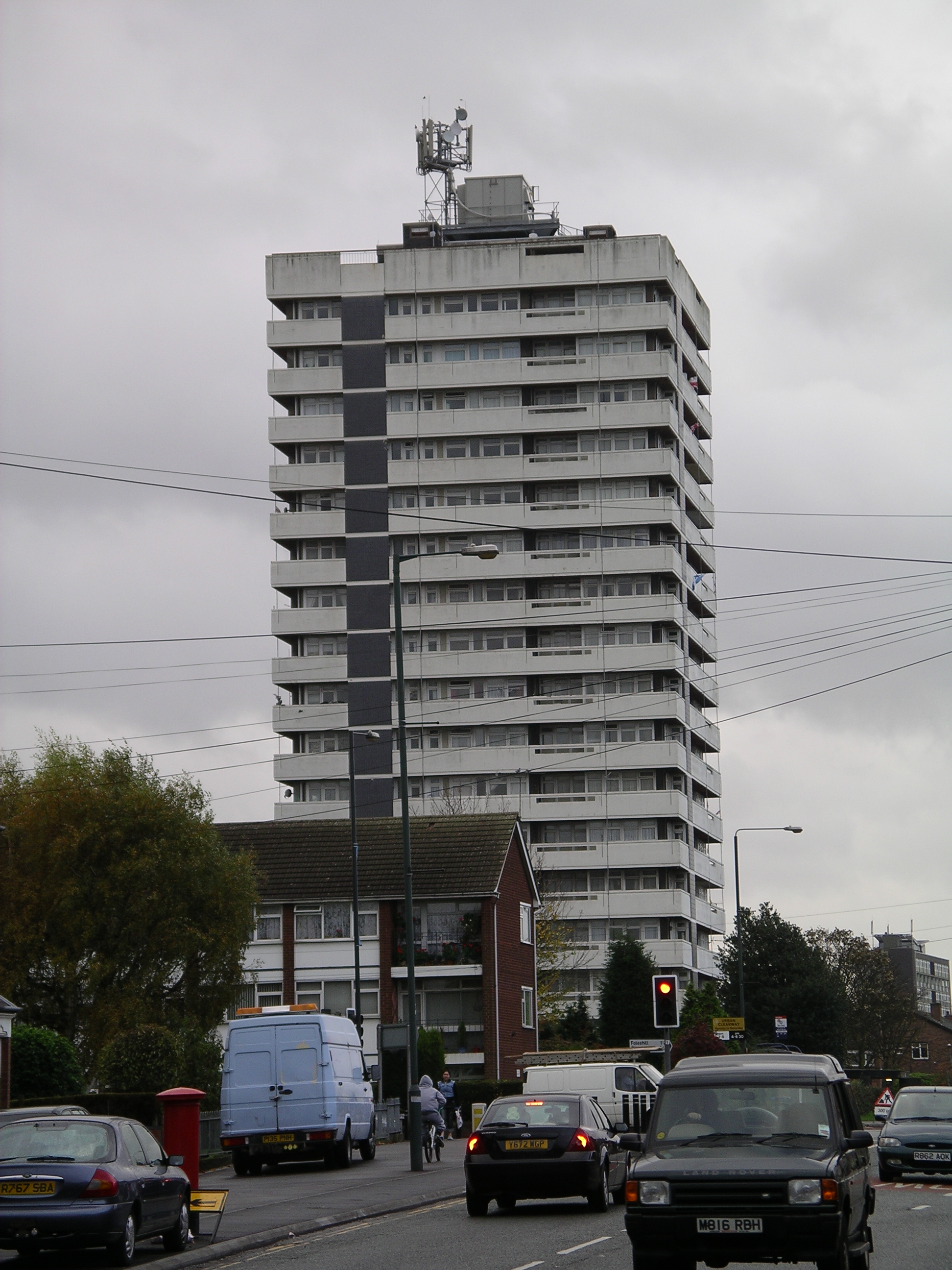
Longfield House

Longfield House is a 16-story block of flats about 51 m tall situated on Bell Green Road, Courthouse Green. It was completed in 1967, and contains 129 flats.

== Shopping and Park and Ride ==
Courthouse Green is home to a The Range (retailer) store, number of fast food outlets, a gym, and a home improvement store which are adjacent to the A444 road, in addition the Gallagher Retail Park is on the opposite side of the A444. Also the Coventry Park and Ride North, funded by Centro and operated by Central Connect under contract, is located in Courthouse Green located near The Range store. This service won a sixth month reprieve after being under threat of withdrawal in March 2009 due to low passenger usage.

== Morris Engines ==
Morris Engines purchased a 45-acre (180,000 m2) site at Courthouse Green in 1927. During the mid-1930s, new buildings were erected. During the late 1930s, the Courthouse Green factory was turning out over 3,000 power units per week and throughout World War II, it was working flat-out making engines for fire pumps, ambulances, military vehicles, lifeboats and tanks, as well as making component parts for aero engines and for Rotol variable pitch air screws. During the 1960s the Cooper S variants of the BMC A-Series engine were developed and produced at the Courthouse Green plant, as well as both engines and gearboxes for all Austin-Healey Sprite and MG Midget sports cars.
