= Coventry park and ride =

Park and ride system in England

Coventry Park and Ride South
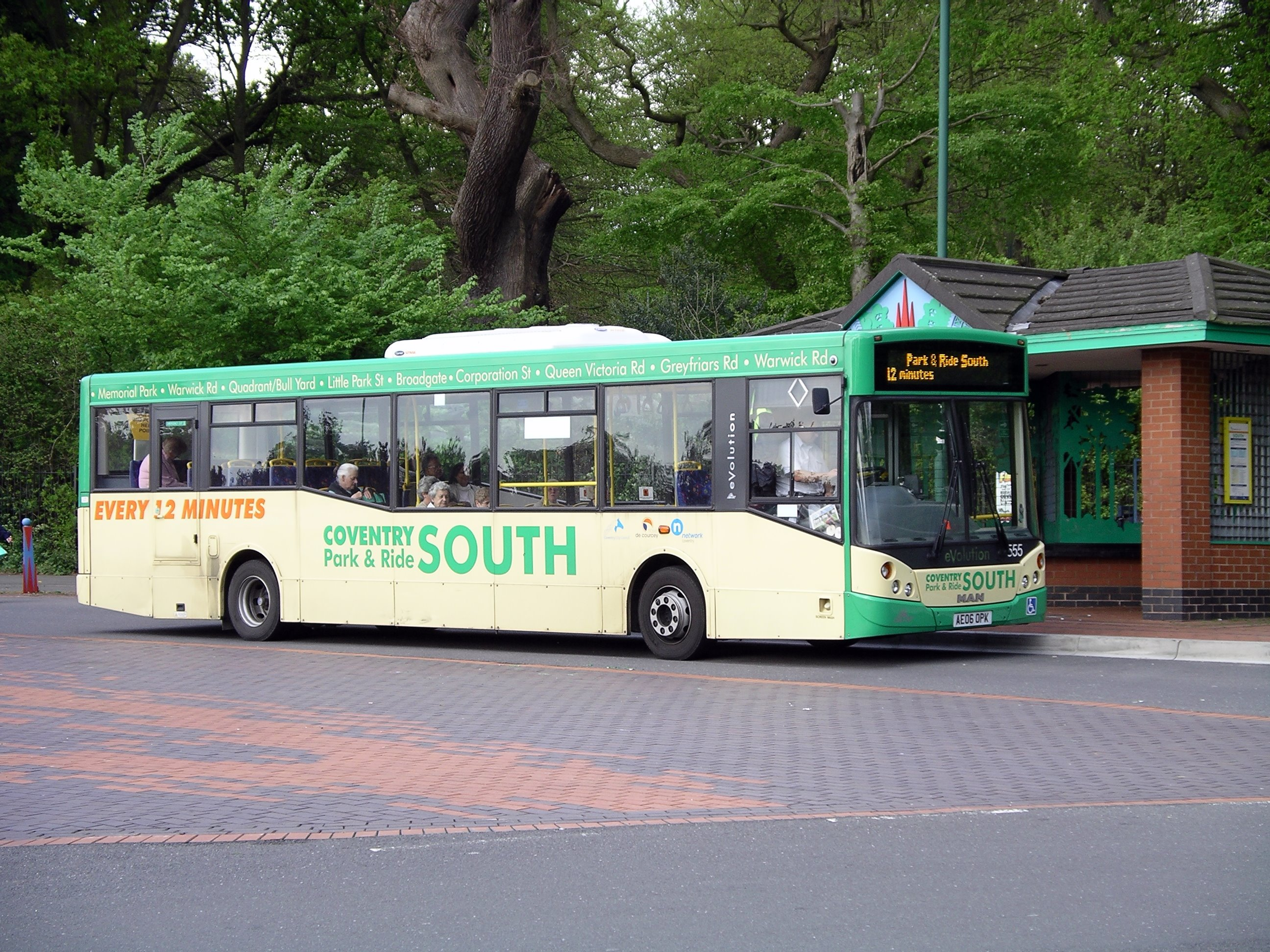
- Travel de Courcey MCV Evolution bodied Man 14.220 bus at War Memorial Park in April 2007
- Parent: Coventry City Council and Transport for West Midlands funded
- Founded: 1999
- Locale: Coventry, England
- Service type: Park and ride
- Routes: Park and Ride South (PRS)
- Destinations: Coventry city centre
- Stations: War Memorial Park
- Operator: Travel West Midlands (?–1999); Travel De Courcey (1999–2013); Stagecoach in Warwickshire (2014– )
- Website: NWM Coventry Park and Ride

Coventry Park and Ride is a park and ride system, operated under contract to Coventry City Council and Transport for West Midlands, in the English city of Coventry. The scheme was launched in 1999 to relieve traffic congestion and to provide a cheaper alternative to city centre parking. The service was jointly operated by Coventry City Council, Centro and Travel de Courcey, with Centro and Coventry City Council jointly responsible for the marketing and setting fares. Buses shuttled passengers between a large free carpark at Austin Drive, Courthouse Green, to and from the city centre.

In June 2012 Travel de Courcey introduced three electric buses to the route, each with a capacity of 40 passengers. This was claimed to be the first use of rapidly rechargeable electric buses in the UK. Also in 2012 the company rebranded the park and ride buses in a burgundy and cream livery, to gain brand recognition for the service.

In June 2013 it was announced the park and ride scheme would cease and the Austin Drive carpark closed. Despite a weekly council subsidy of £1,900 the scheme was still making a loss and carrying only 2.8 passengers per trip, on average. However, in April 2014, the service was awarded to Stagecoach in Warwickshire who agreed to run it profitably without council subsidy.

Buses run every 20 minutes, between Monday and Friday starting at 6:10 am and finishing at 9:25 pm. In early 2021, a West Midlands Cycle Docking Station opened at the stop, which is hoped to increase usage.
