= Stivichall =

Area near Coventry, England

Coordinates: 52°23′N 1°30′W

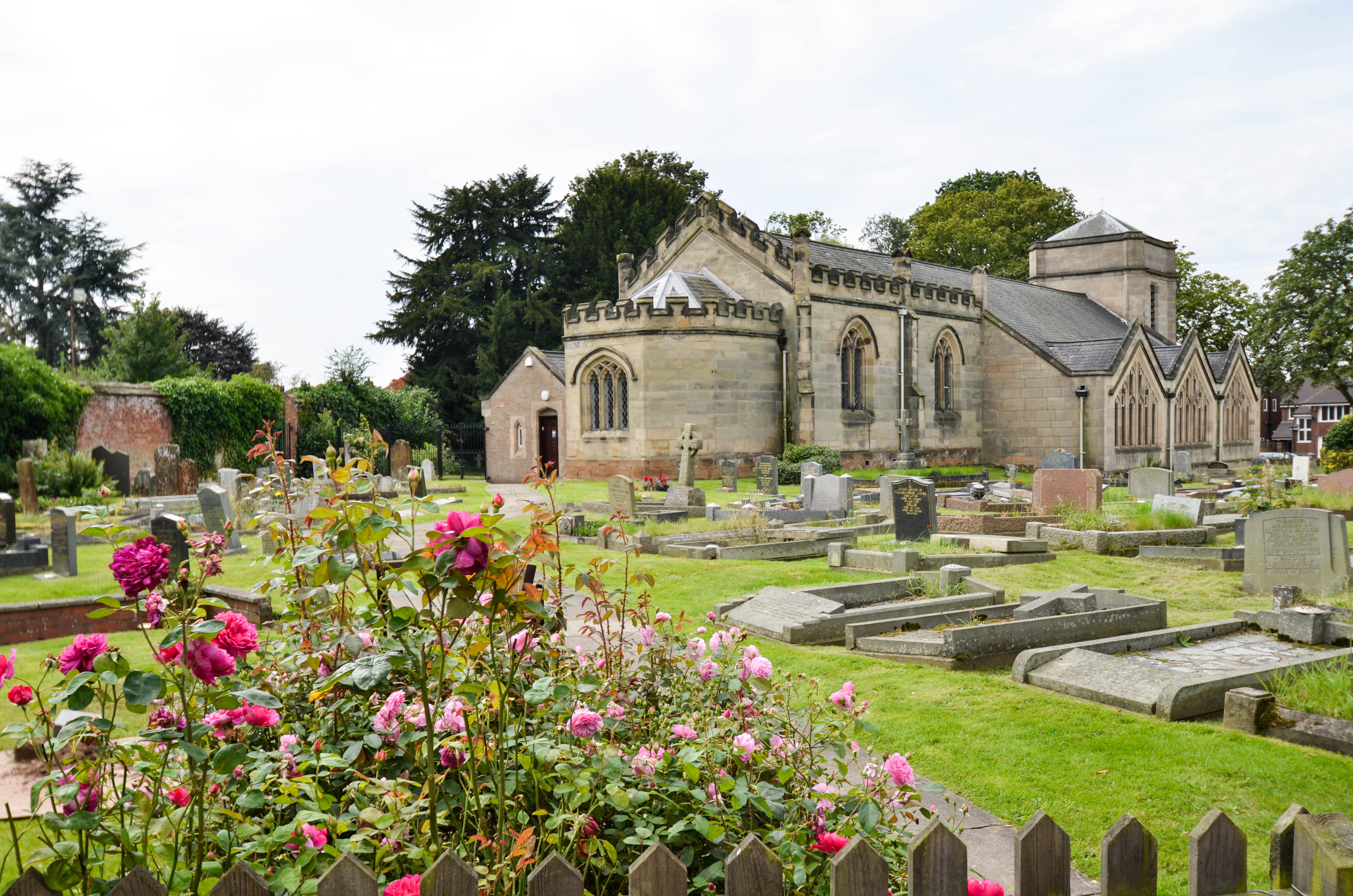
- St James Church

- Location within the West Midlands
- Metropolitan borough: Coventry
- Metropolitan county: West Midlands
- Region: West Midlands
- Country: England
- Sovereign state: United Kingdom
- Post town: COVENTRY
- Postcode district: CV3
- Dialling code: 024
- Police: West Midlands
- Fire: West Midlands
- Ambulance: West Midlands

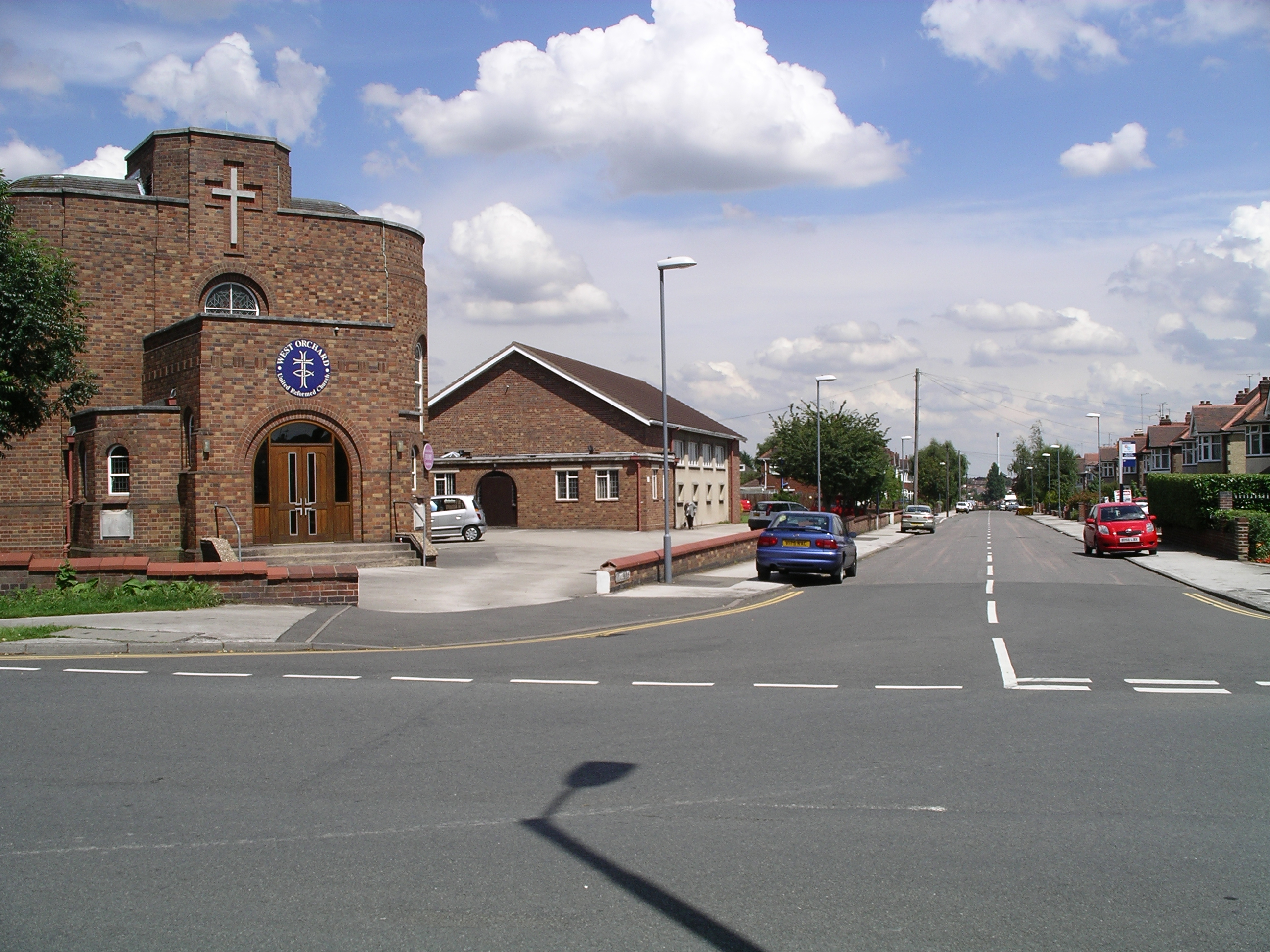
West Orchard Church

Stivichall or Styvechale (/ˈstaɪtʃəl/ STY-chəl) is a suburb of the city of Coventry, in the county of the West Midlands, England. It is a mainly residential area in the south of the city.

== Geography ==
Stivichall is a mainly residential area of south Coventry astride the Leamington Road. Like the city centre, it lies on the right terraces of the vale carved by the Sherbourne, an intermittently great stream which rises in Allesley in the borough and flows along the eastern boundary as an upper sub-tributary of the River Avon, Warwickshire. The small suburb of Fenside forms part of southeast Stivichall. To the north and northwest Stivichall borders the War Memorial Park a civic nationally Grade II listed park and garden which separates the neighbourhood from most parts of similarly residential Earlsdon along Coat of Arms Bridge Road.

The district of Cheylesmore blends into the area contiguously to the northeast. Much relatively narrower Whitley Common, which is a flood meadow, and one of two dual feeder roads to Coventry's centre on it, separates Whitley to the east. The southern border of Stivichall is shared with the northern border of the city's Finham and Green Lane neighbourhoods along the A45 dual carriageway.

The western area of Stivichall, known locally as Styvechale Grange, is a large residential district developed during the late-1960s and early-1970s to cater for Coventry's then-rapidly rising population (which peaked at 340,000 inhabitants in 1971).

=== Incidents of pre-1919 ownership ===
A rural parish on the outskirts of Coventry, the Styvechale manor had belonged to the Gregory family since the 16th century from whom in 1919 the land was purchased by Coventry Corporation and used in part to create the War Memorial Park, with the general development of the remainder following by the 1970s.

The main roads from Coventry to Leamington Spa and Kenilworth pass through and join within the boundaries of Stivichall, and whilst the estate was in the Gregory family's ownership, access was denied to the roads unless a toll of 1d per horse and 6d per vehicle was paid to them. The toll house which stood at the junction of the roads was demolished in 1964.

== History ==
In 1931 the civil parish had a population of 76. On 1 April 1932 the parish was abolished and merged with Coventry and Baginton.

=== Etymology ===
It is thought that the name comes from the Old English 'styfic', meaning 'tree stumps' and 'healh', meaning 'nook' or 'corner'.

Although the pronunciation ('Styche-ull’) of the district is not in doubt, its spelling is a subject of debate. The 'Styvechale' variant is generally deemed more attractive in fitting with the Old English tradition of the district's name, though since 1945 'Stivichall' has been the official designation for the area, and all direction signage currently reads 'Stivichall'. However, in the early-1990s there was a campaign to reintroduce the 'Styvechale' variant on local signage and within civic circles, with many people finding the Stivichall designation ugly. The local bus operators also historically never display Stivichall or Styvechale on their buses and opt for displaying Fenside instead and when route 2 used to terminate in Exminster Road buses had always displayed Cheylesmore, an alternative to this could have been a destination of 'Howes Farm' in similar fashion to the modern Tanyard Farm and Victoria Farm estates in Coventry.

== Education ==
Stivichall Primary School is bounded by Green Lane and Coat of Arms Bridge Road, where the Green Lane district meets Stivichall. It has around 530 pupils aged from five to eleven years old. The original buildings, a hospital in the early 1930s, became a Junior school after the Second World War and were demolished in 2008. Grange Farm Primary School is located within the Styvechale Grange district.

== Styvechale Manor ==
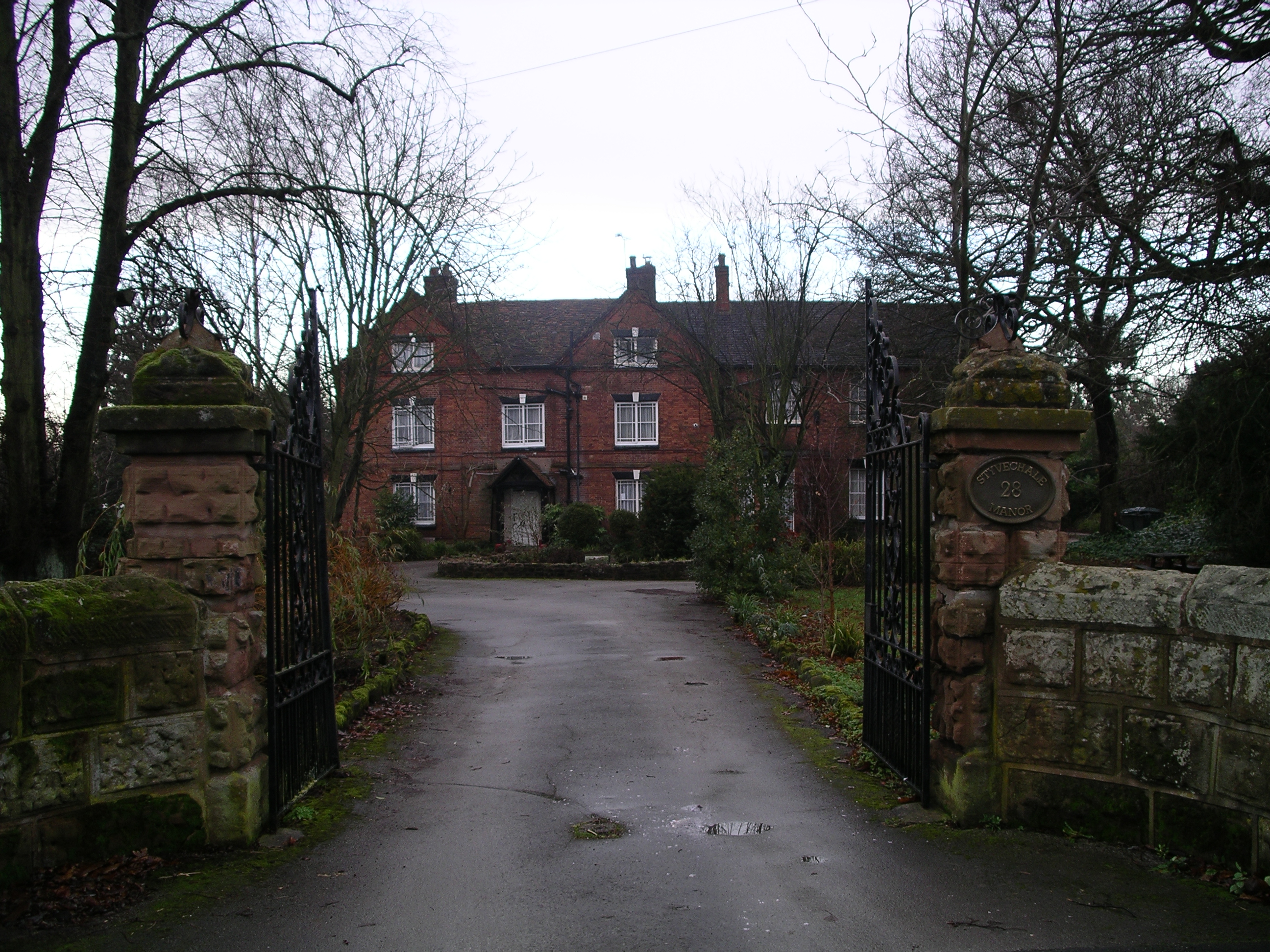
Styvechale Manor (photo 2007)

The core of Styvechale Manor may date from the late 17th century and may have been built on the site of a medieval manor house. Many extensions were added to it from Victorian times onwards. In the 19th and early 20th centuries it was known as the Manor House, until it became Bremond College, a girls' private school, in about 1935. The property, a Grade II listed building, has since been converted into apartments.

== Stivichall Hall ==
Stivichall Hall was built by the Gregory family in the 1750s, on a site south of St James's Church, between the modern Montpellier Close and Ridgeway Avenue. It was a three-storey building with a frontage of five windows on each storey, subsequently extended into a seven-window fronted building. In 1928 it was sold with some of the estate to Coventry Corporation, but it became derelict and was demolished after World War II.

When Major C. H. Gregory-Hood sold the estate in 1932, he gave an area of fields and woods around Stivichall Croft and Coat of Arms Bridge Road to Coventry Corporation for permanent preservation. A red sandstone obelisk recording the gift stands on this site, produced at a cost of £87 7s 6d.

== Gregory bridge ==
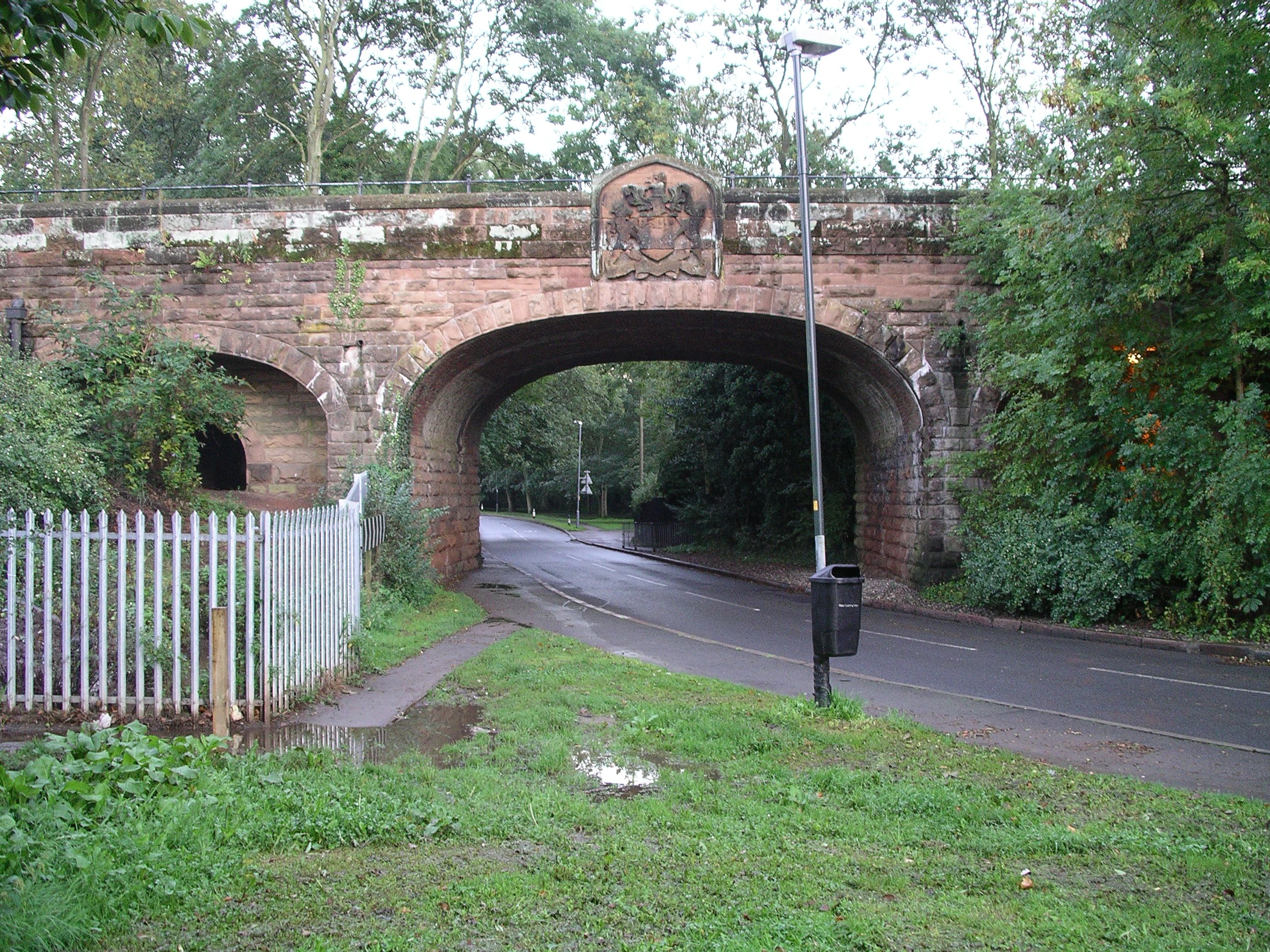
Gregory bridge / Coat of Arms Bridge

The Gregory bridge, also known as 'Coat of Arms Bridge', is a railway bridge that carries trains running between Coventry and Leamington Spa. The land on which the line was built was owned by the Gregory family, and having opposed the project, in 1842 Mr A F Gregory finally agreed to sell just sufficient land for the line's construction, but only on the condition that the Gregory family coat-of-arms was incorporated into the face of the bridge. The line was opened on completion of the work in 1844.

== St James's Church ==
The original St James's Church dated back to about 1270 and was demolished around 1800. The present church, situated on Leamington Road, was completed in 1817, having taken seven years to build. It was extended to its present size in 1955.

== Stivichall Grange ==
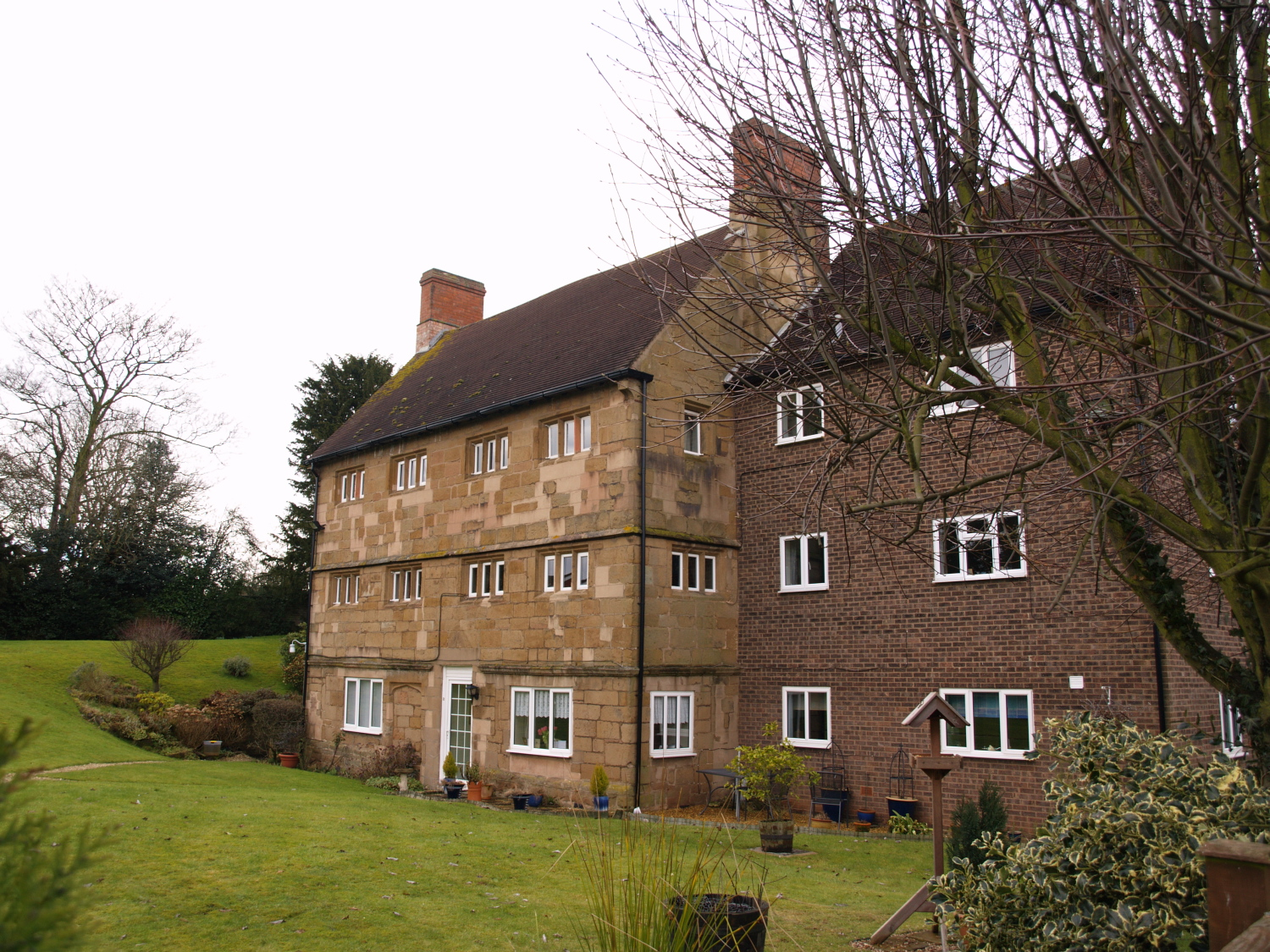
Stivichall Grange

Half a mile south west of St James's Church and close to the A45 is a three-storey, Grade II-listed, 17th-century house known as Stivichall Grange. Built about 1650 according to Pevsner, it was in use as a farmhouse into the 1960s. By 1971 it was unoccupied and threatened with demolition. However, the main part of the building was saved, extended and converted into apartments. It has given its name to the surrounding residential area constructed in the late-1960s and early-1970s

== Gallery ==
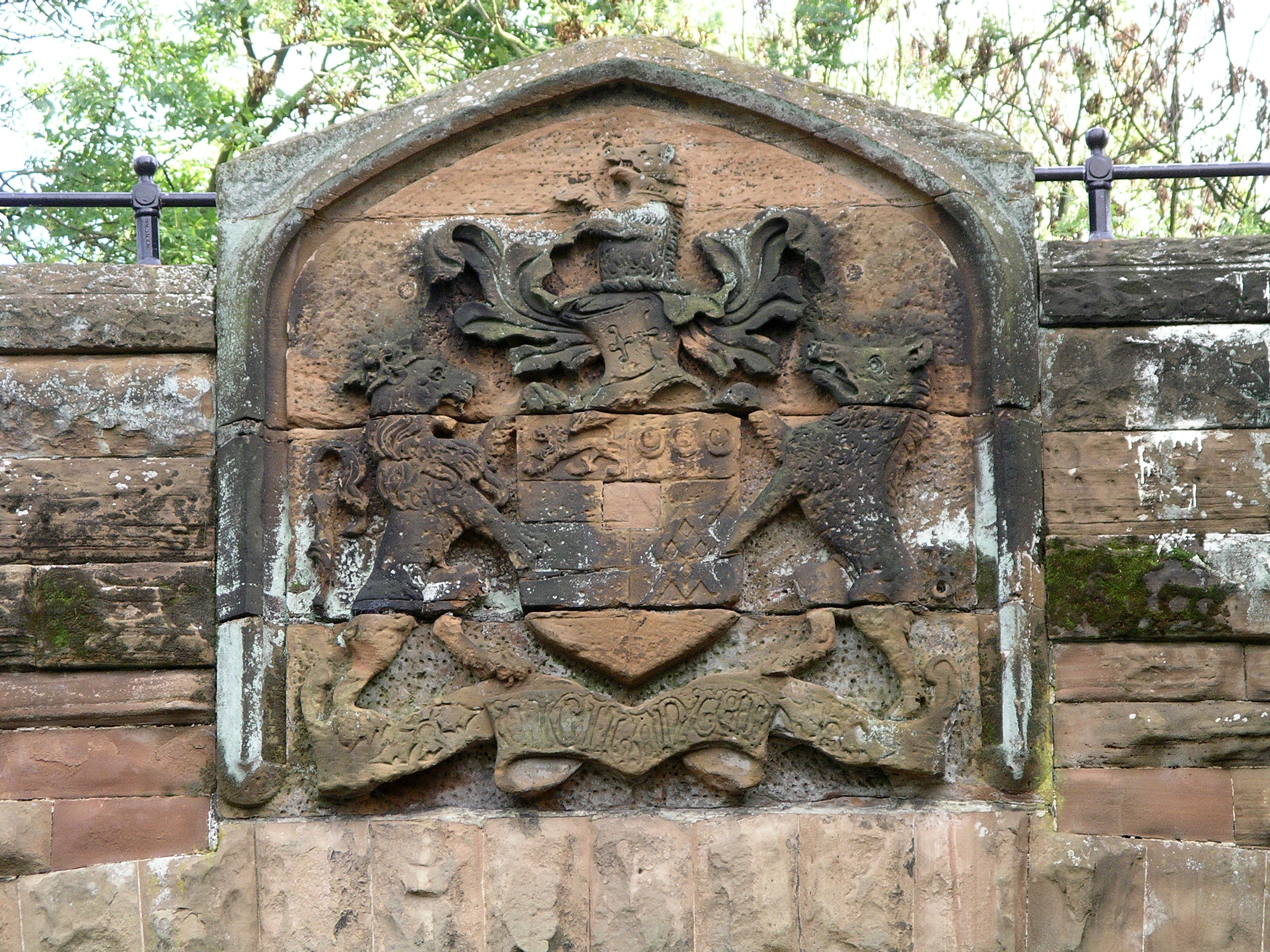
Coat of Arms on the Gregory bridge

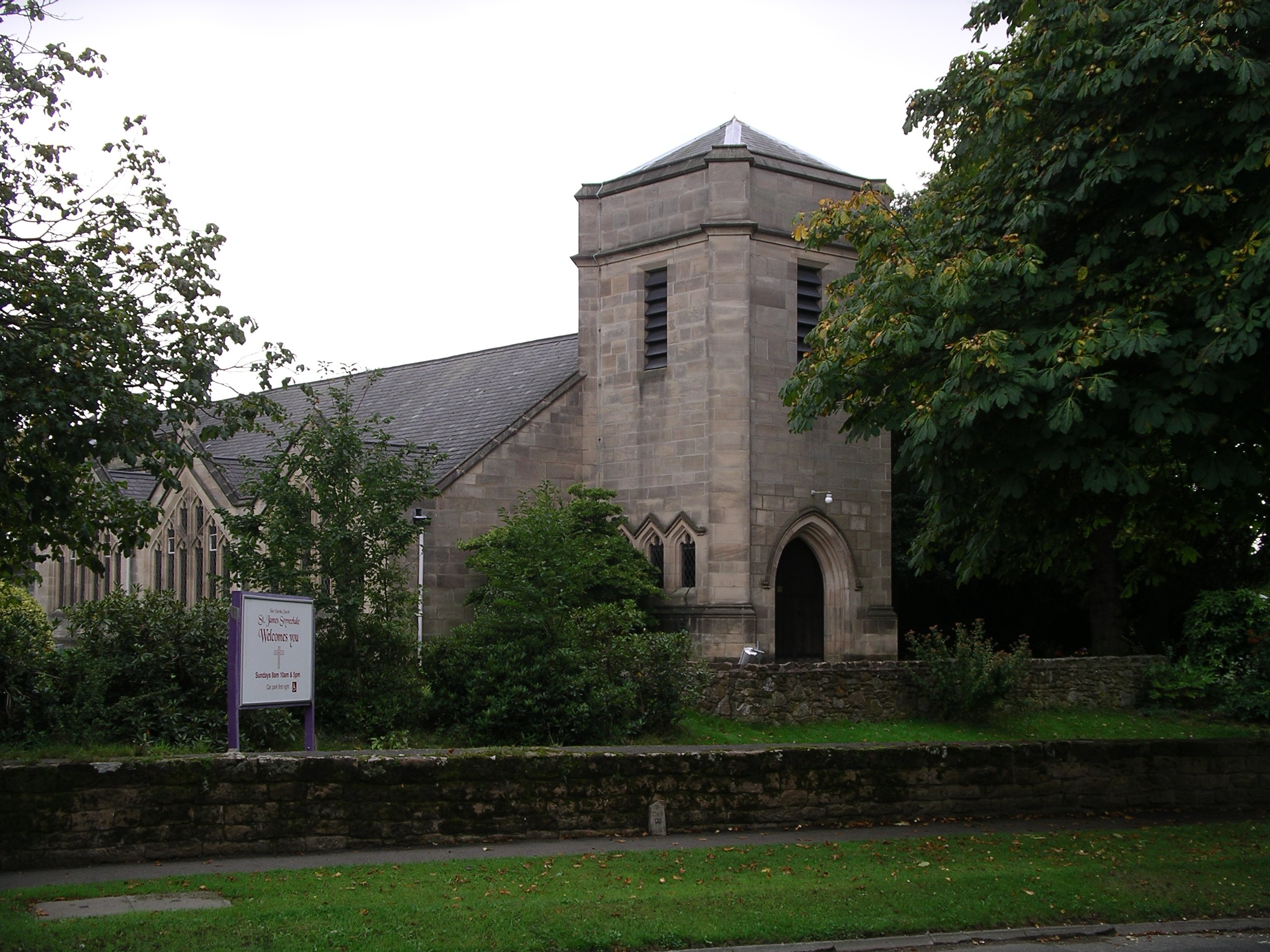
St James's Church from Leamington Road

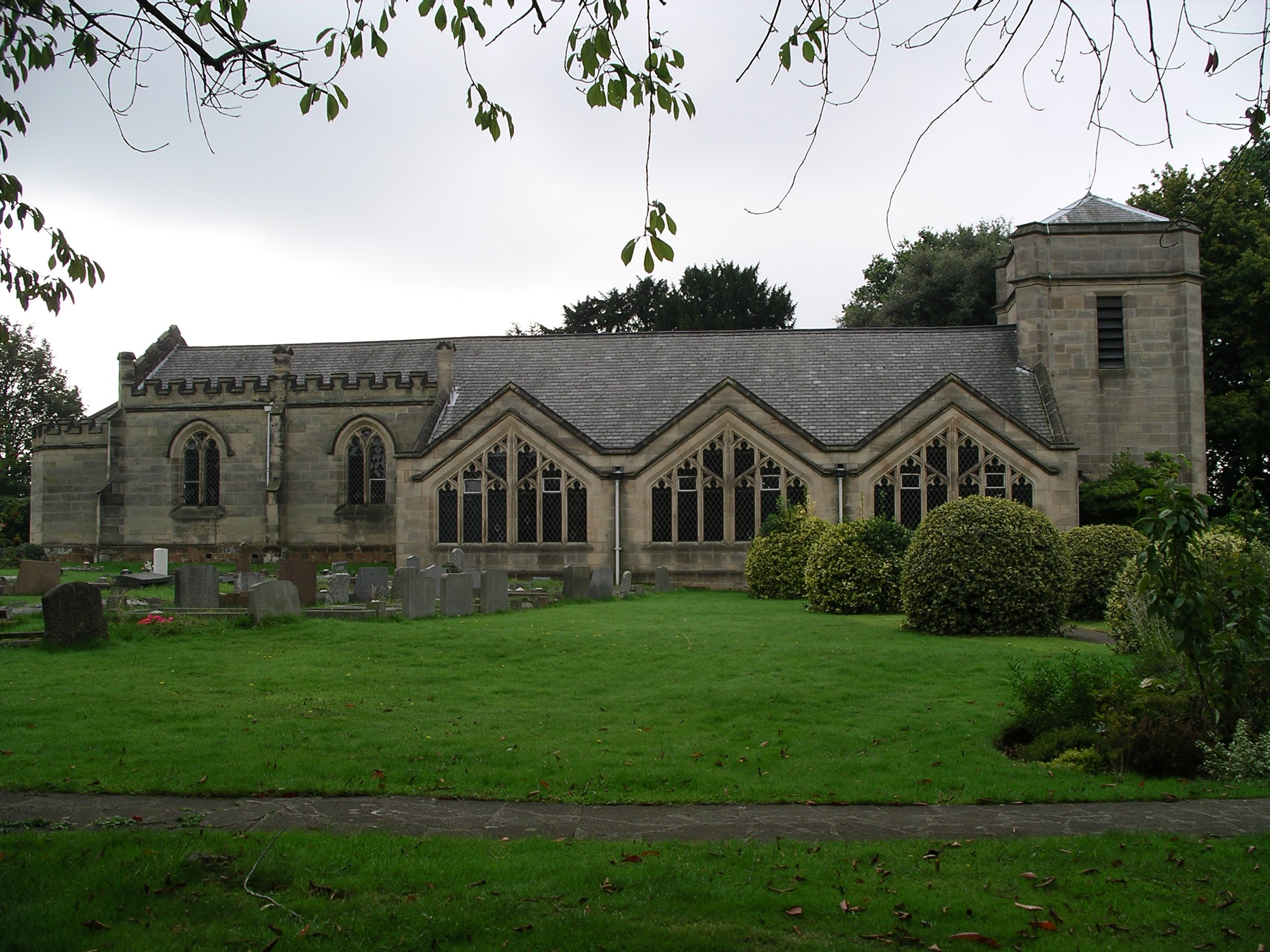
St James's Church, north side

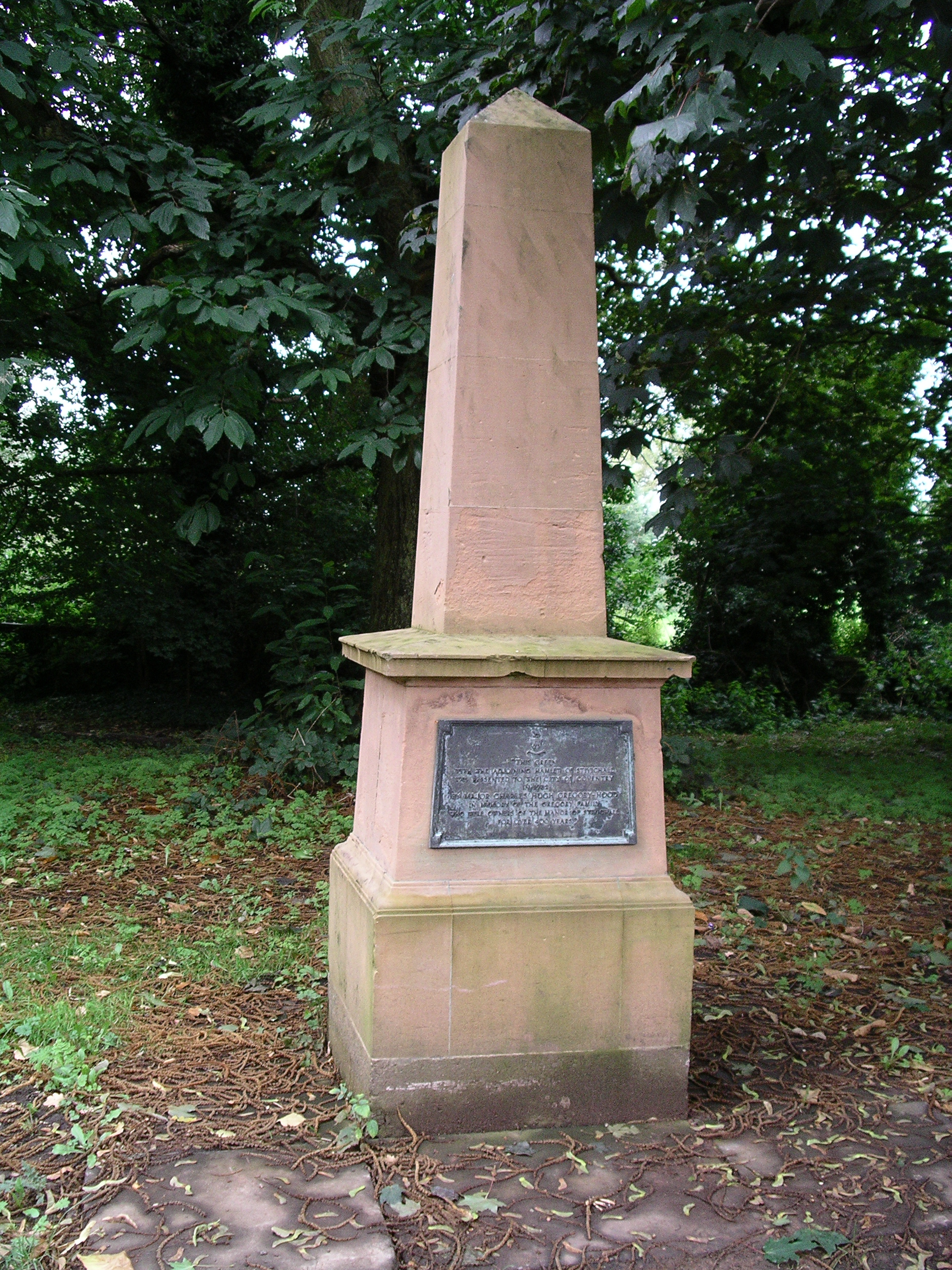
Obelisk and memorial to the Gregory-Hood family

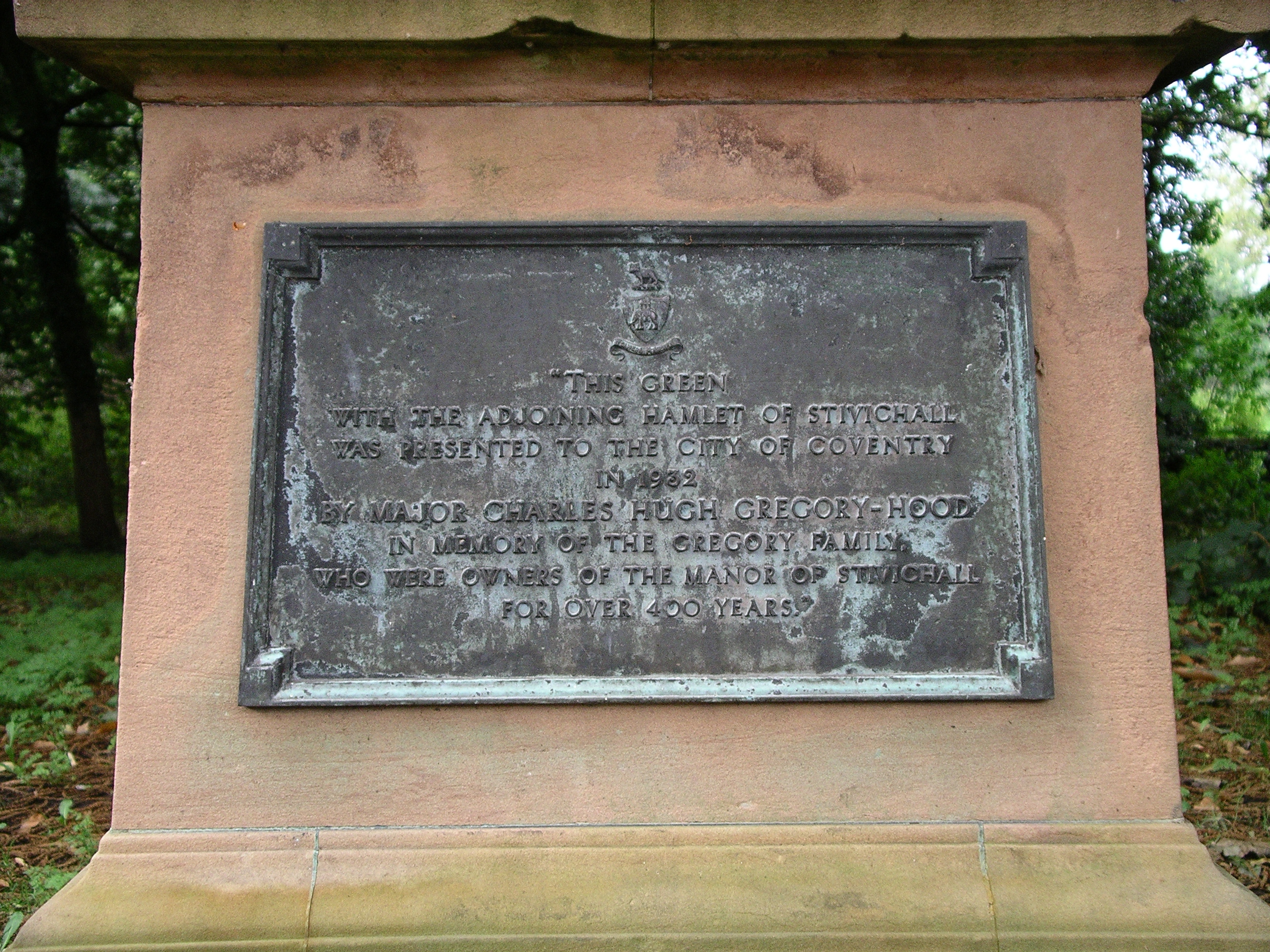
Plaque on the obelisk
