= War Memorial Park, Coventry =

Public park in Coventry, England

War Memorial Park
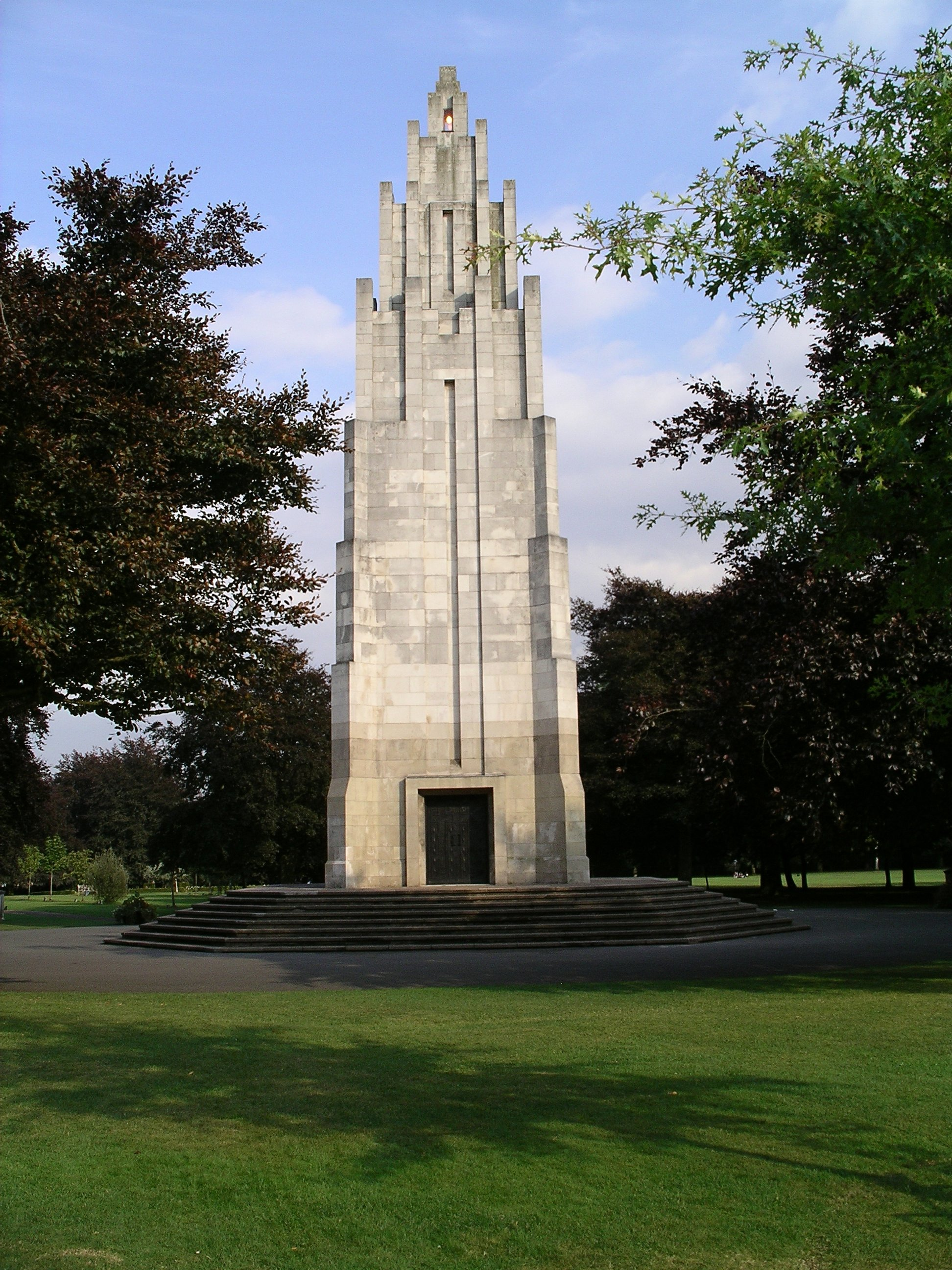
- Coventry War Memorial, the city's war memorial at the centre of the park
- Interactive map of War Memorial Park
- Type: Public park
- Location: Coventry, England
- OS grid: SP324770
- Coordinates: 52.390132°N 1.523113°W
- Area: 48.5 hectares (120 acres)
- Created: July 1921
- Operator: Coventry City Council
- Status: Open all year

The War Memorial Park is a large park of about 48.5 hectares in southern Coventry, England. The park was opened in July 1921 as a tribute to the 2,587 Coventrians who died between 1914 and 1918 fighting in the First World War. The landscaped gardens and sports areas were created in the late-1920s and 1930s, and the most prominent structure in the park is the city's war memorial, built in 1927.

== History ==
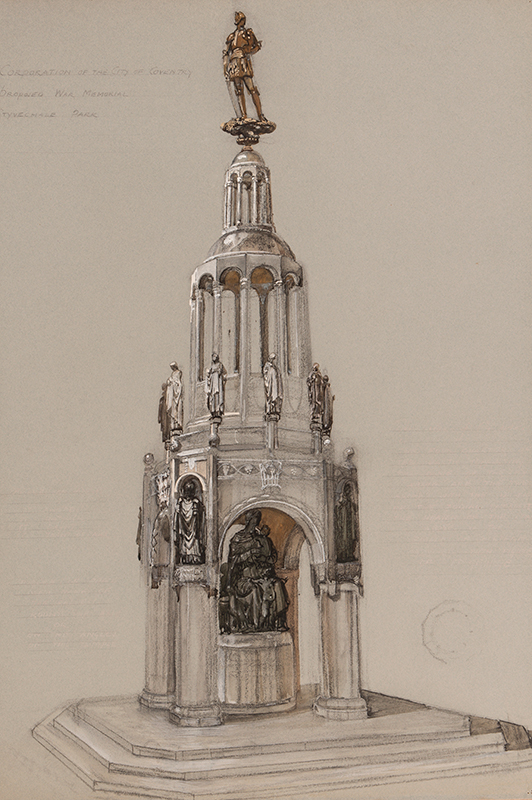
Alternative proposal for the memorial, for the Corporation of the City of Coventry, by an anonymous hand, circa 1925

=== Land ===
The park was opened in July 1921 as a tribute to the 2,587 Coventrians who died between 1914 and 1918 fighting in the First World War. Coventry Council used money donated by the public to purchase the land from the Lords of Styvechale Manor, the Gregory-Hood family, when it was little more than a large grassed area that once formed Styvechale common. In the north of the park, the landscaped gardens and sports areas were created in the late-1920s and 1930s,

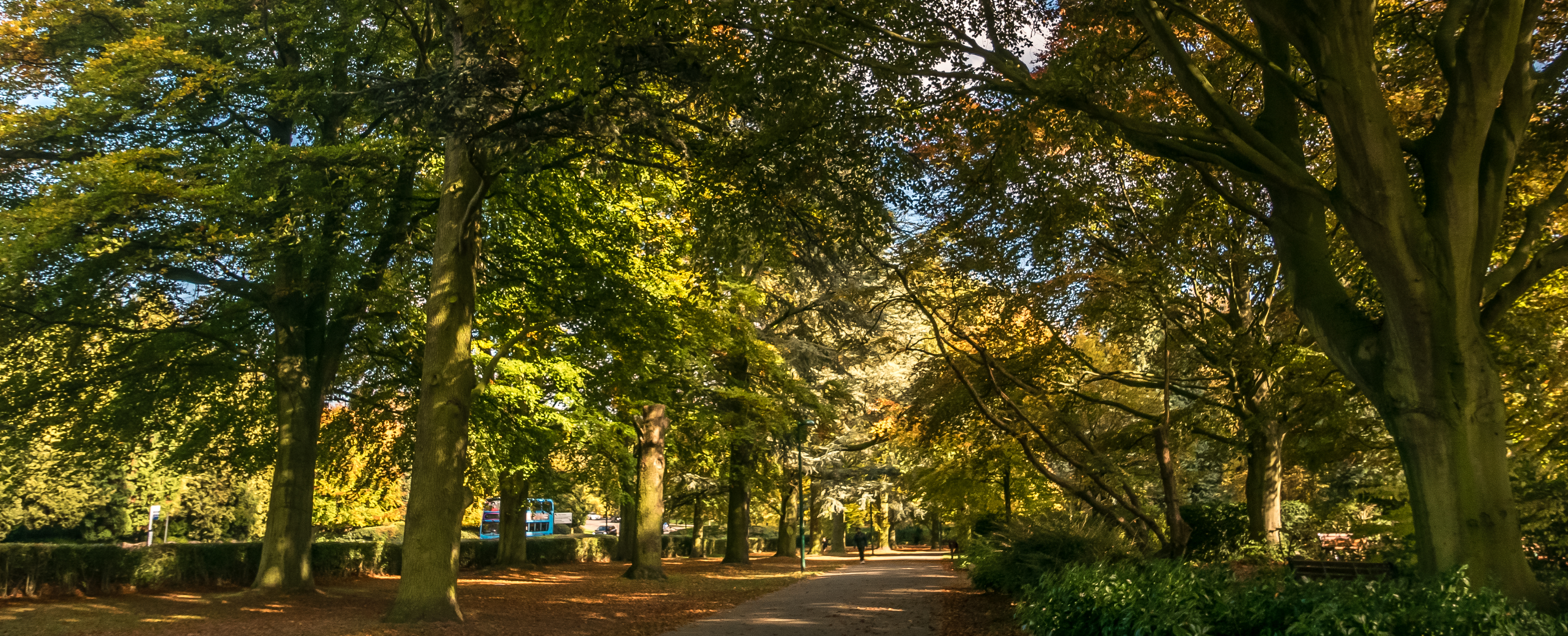
Autumnal photograph of the iconic avenue of Atlantic cedars in Coventry's War Memorial Park looking North.

During the Second World War, barrage balloons and anti-aircraft guns were sited in the park, and the large concrete blocks where they were positioned still exist in the Coat of Arms bridge area of the park.

In 2013, the park was listed at Grade II on the statutory Register of Historic Parks and Gardens of special historic interest in England. The war memorial is a Grade II* listed building in its own right.

In July 2013 the park gained green flag status, retaining it in 2017.

On 16 July 2014 Prince William, Duke of Cambridge visited the park to formally launch the Centenary Fields programme of the Fields in Trust by granting the first designation under the scheme to the park.

=== Monument ===
At around 90 feet (27 m) high, the war memorial monument is the most prominent construction in the park. It was designed by local architect T. F. Tickner and £5,000 was raised from a public appeal that commenced in 1924 to fund the building work. It was built in 1927 and dedicated by Field Marshal Douglas Haig on 8 October 1927. It is made of Portland stone, and was built by John Gray who also built the Courtaulds works at Foleshill and a number of housing estates. Inside the memorial is a room called the Chamber of Silence which contains the "Roll of the Fallen", a list of all Coventry men killed in the two World Wars and the Gulf War, and is open to the public every year on Remembrance Sunday.

== Refurbishment ==
Work started in August 2010 on a multi-million pound refurbishment of the park, involving about 30 projects taking place around the park over a ten-month period. The work was funded by a £2.8 million grant from the Heritage Lottery Fund and the Big Lottery Fund together with money from Coventry City Council. Additionally a grant of £50,000 was awarded in February 2011 to create a new under-8s play area in the park.

== Facilities and events ==
The park's facilities include football pitches, bowling greens, a small golf course, tennis courts, a splash and play area, an aviary for small birds, and a skate board area, but it mainly comprises large open green areas with many trees and shrubberies. A perimeter path lies just inside the park's boundaries, and now encircles the entire park following completion of groundwork on the south-western segment in the summer of 2006.

The park is the venue for a number of annual events including the Godiva Festival, Donkey Derby, Caribbean Festival and the Vaisakhi Mela. The park also holds weekly parkruns – free, timed 5 km (3.1 mi) runs – that attract over 300 people to the park every Saturday.

The park was also the host of Radio 1's Big Weekend festival, the first event since 2019. The festival took place there from 27 to 29 May 2022 and featured big stars, including the likes of Ed Sheeran, Calvin Harris, Anne-Marie, AJ Tracey, George Ezra, Lorde, Sam Fender, Foals and Harry Styles.

== Car parks ==
The main car park is a large tarmaced area with access from Kenilworth Road. Travel de Courcey (in conjunction with Coventry City Council and Transport for West Midlands) operates a park and ride scheme between here and Coventry city centre. There is a much smaller car park on Coat of Arms Bridge Road on the southern side of the park and another small car park near the northern end of Leamington Road.

== Images ==
Features in the park

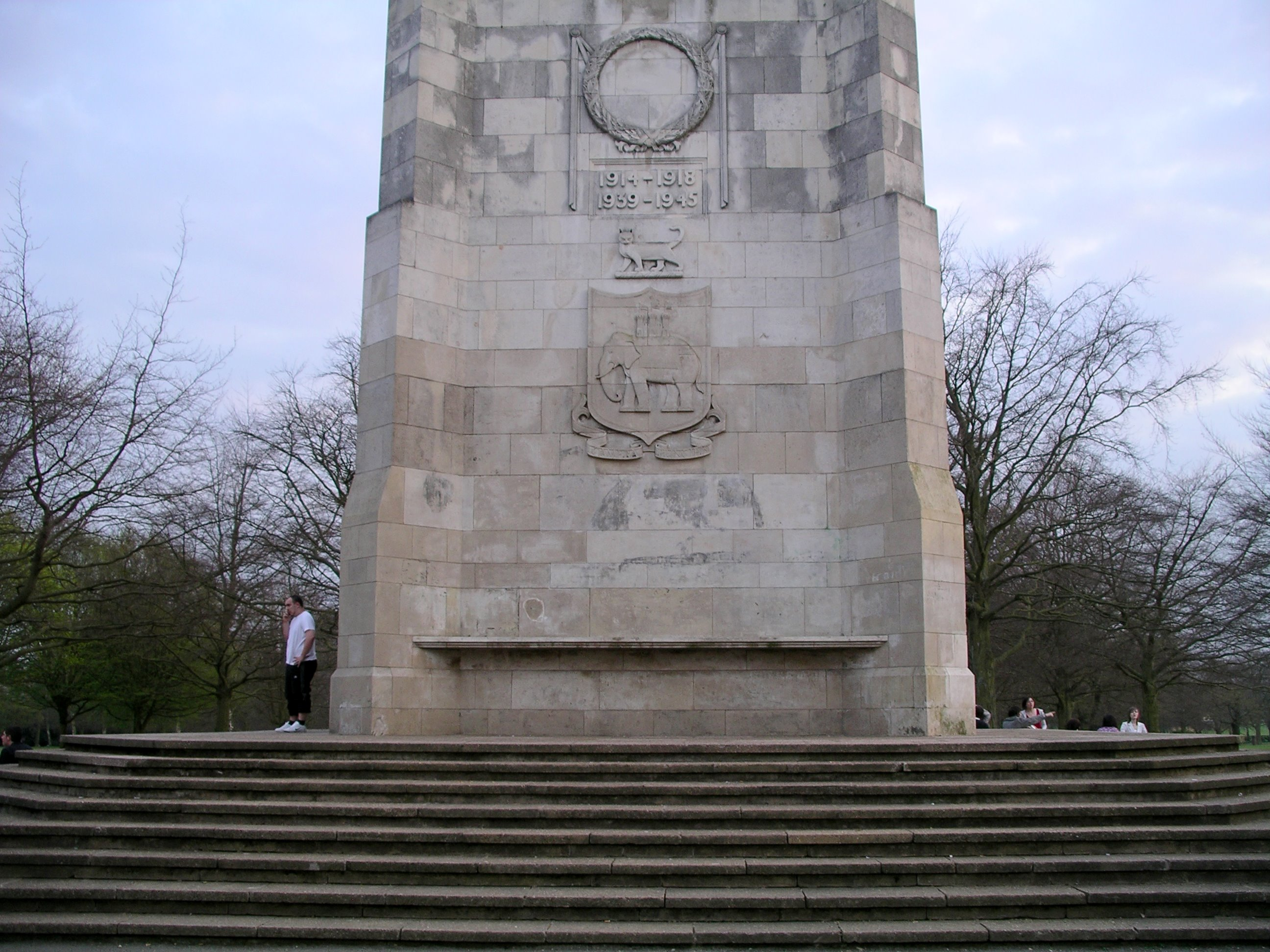
Steps at the base of the war memorial

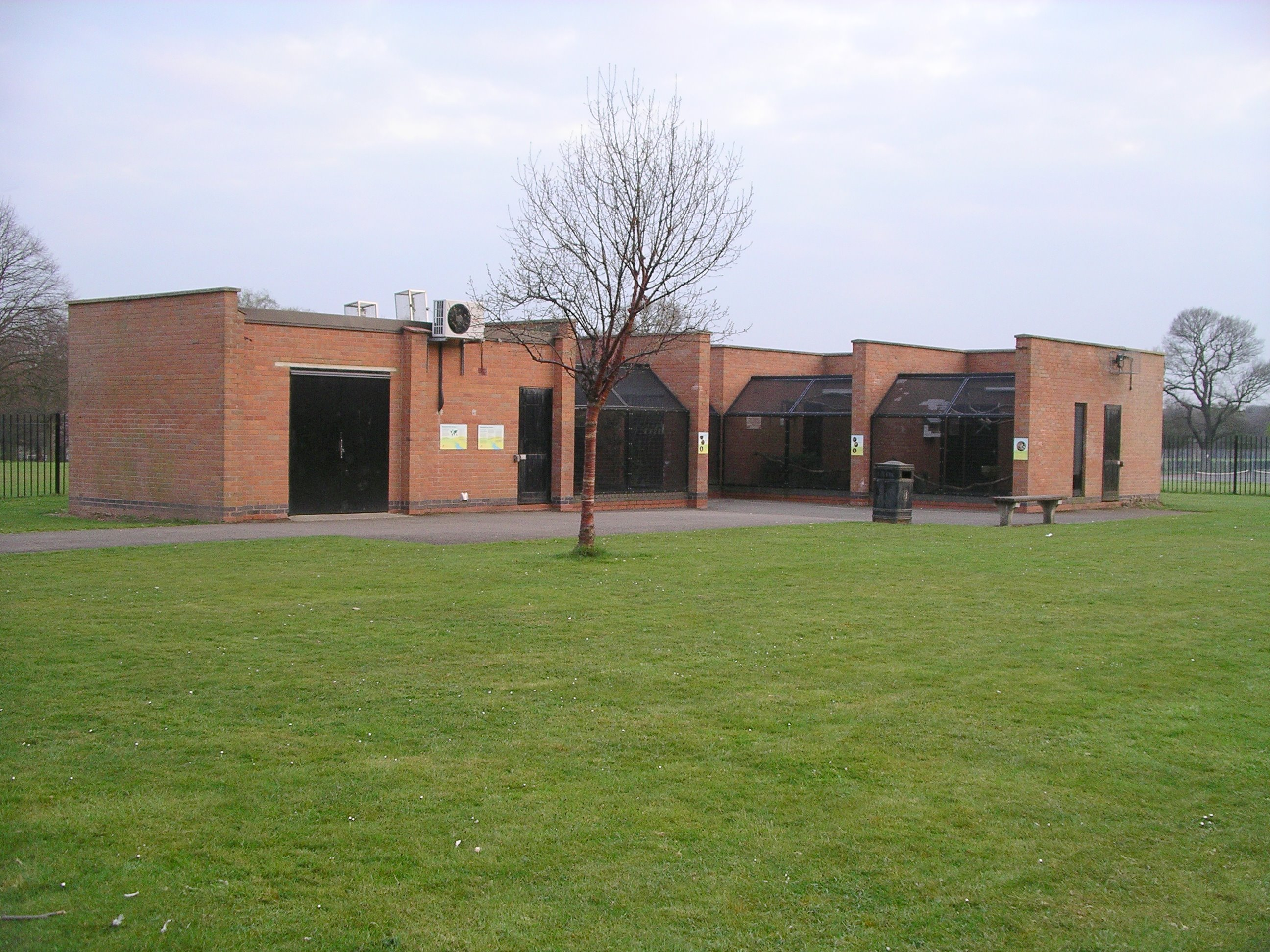
The small aviary

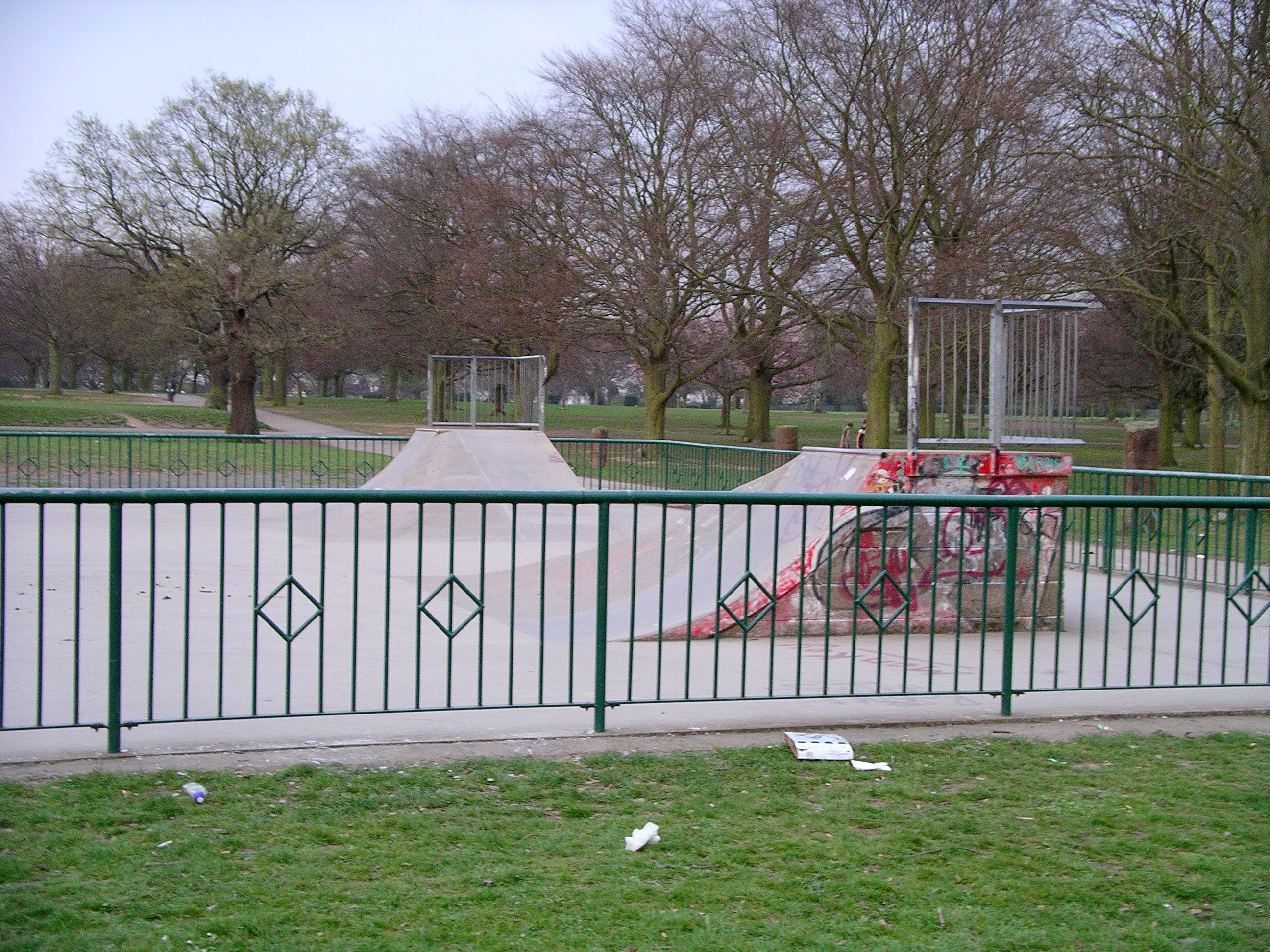
The skate board and BMX area

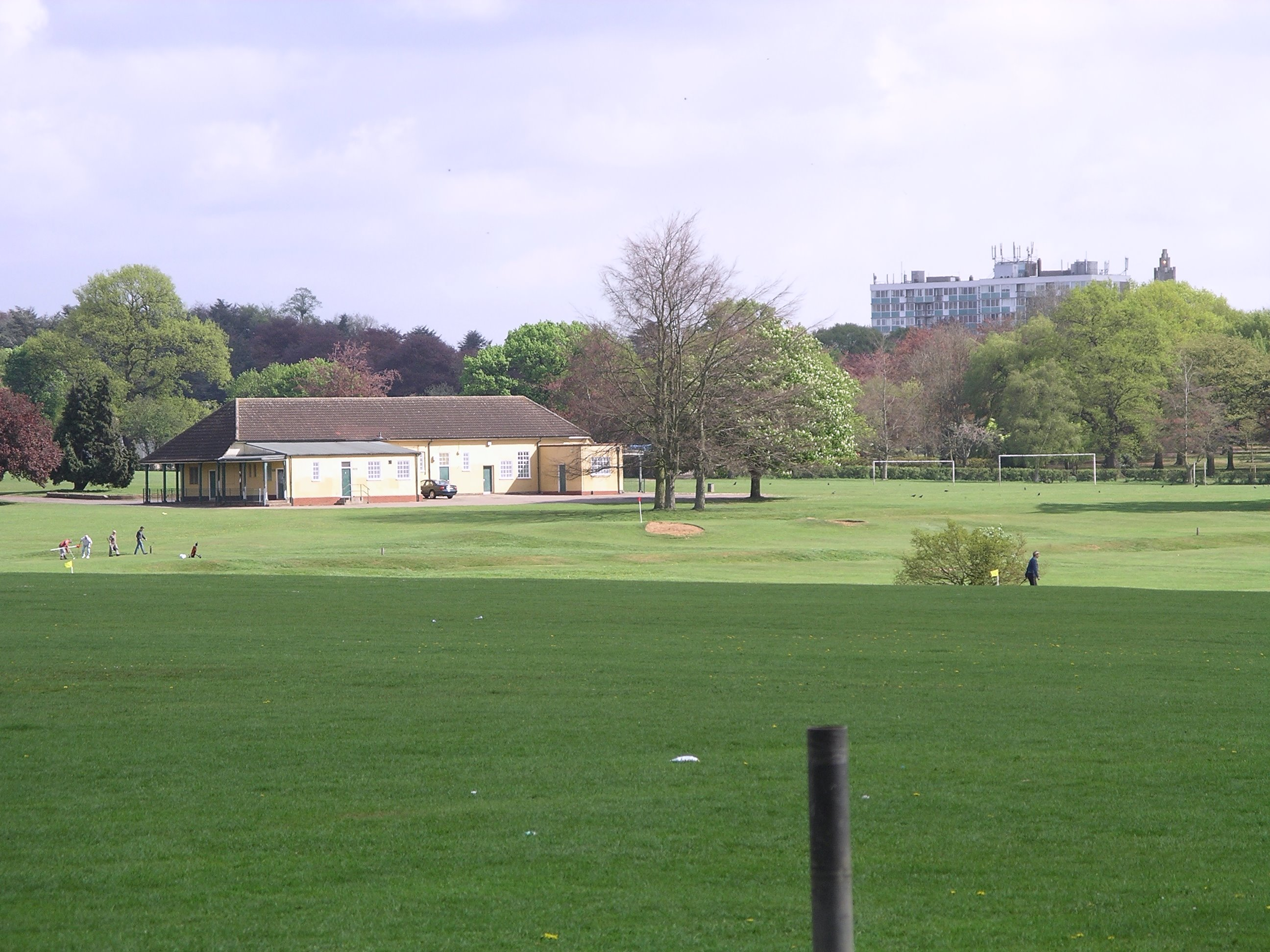
View from the south of the park looking northeast

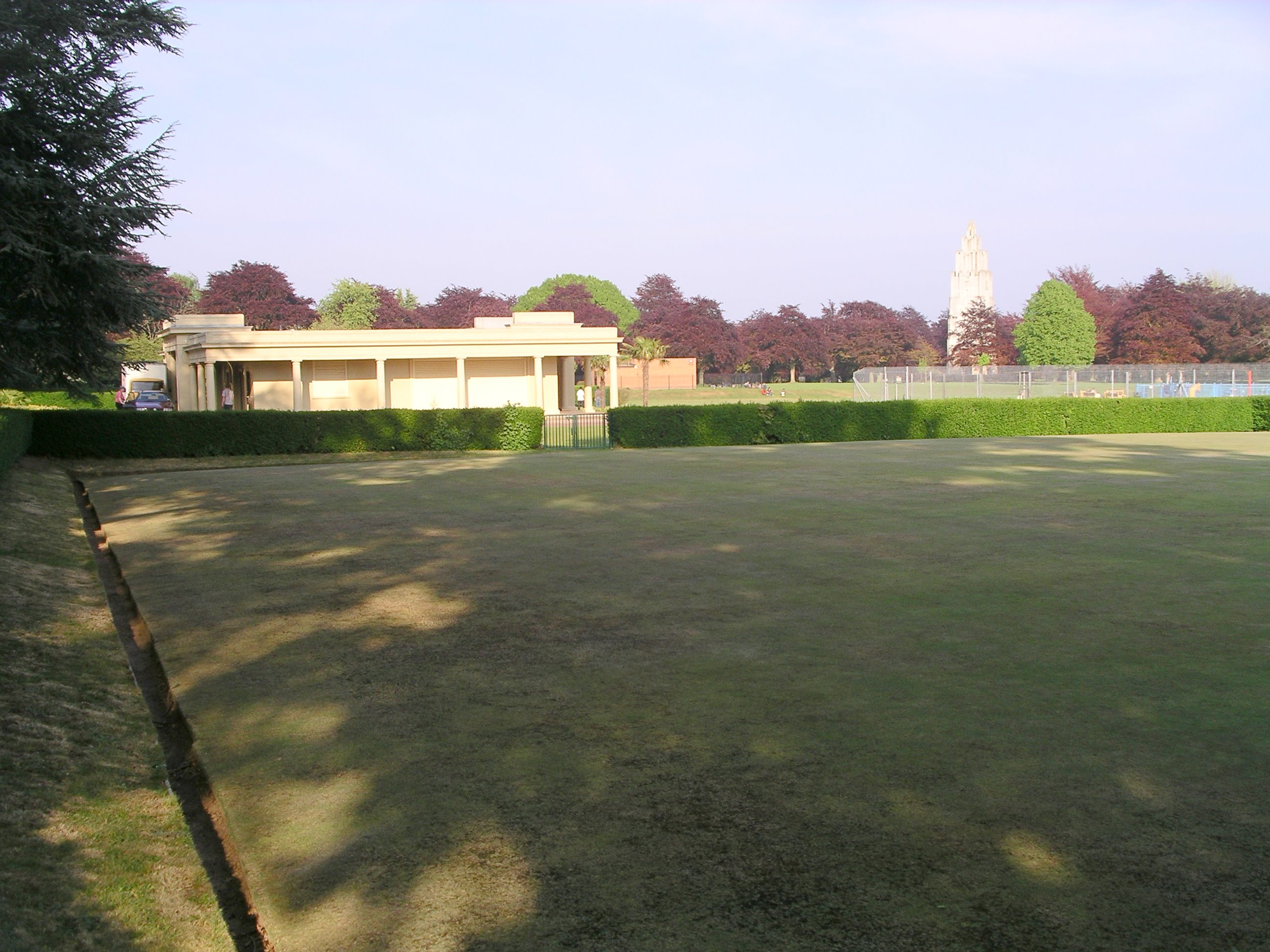
A bowling green

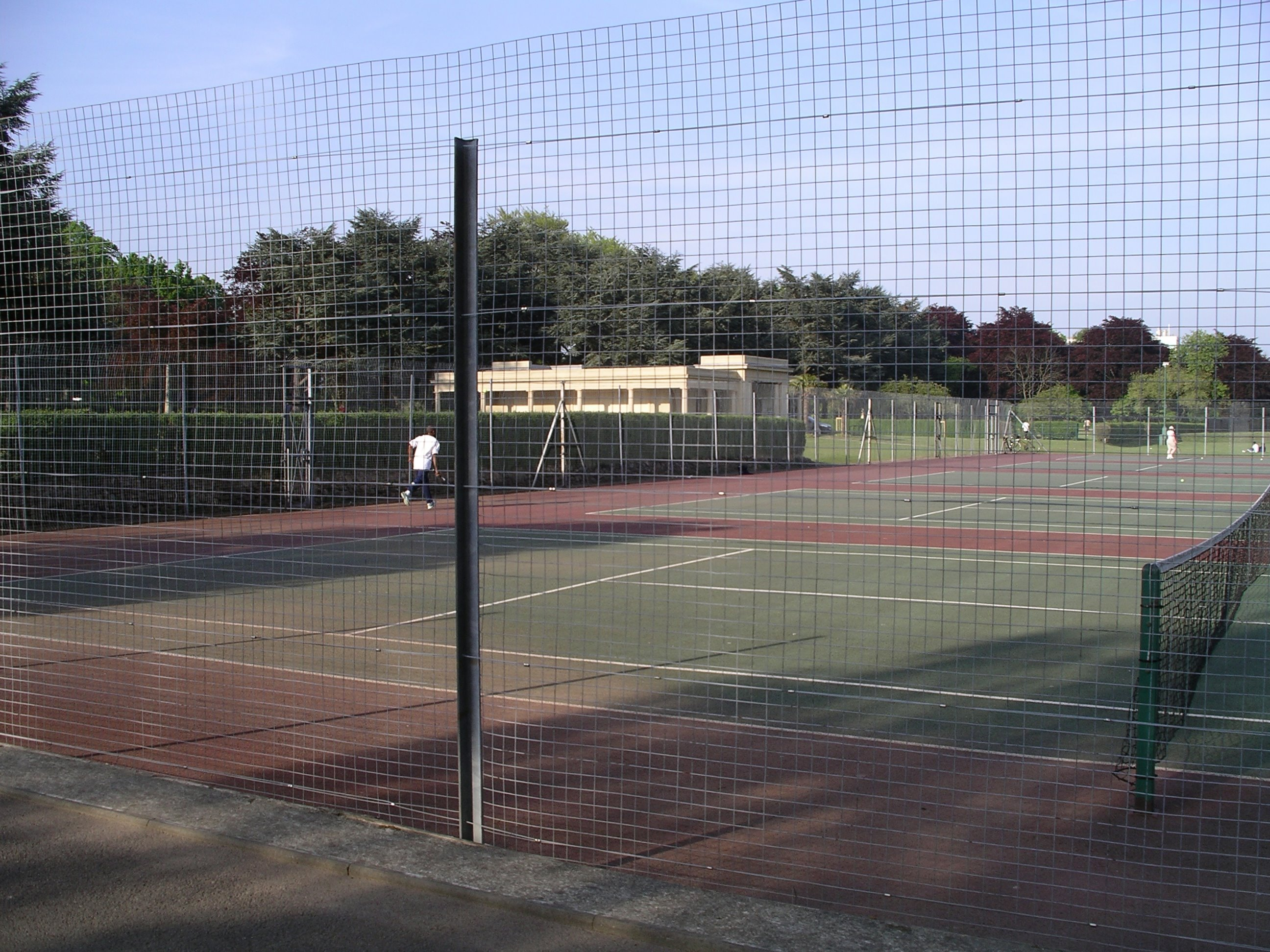
Tennis courts

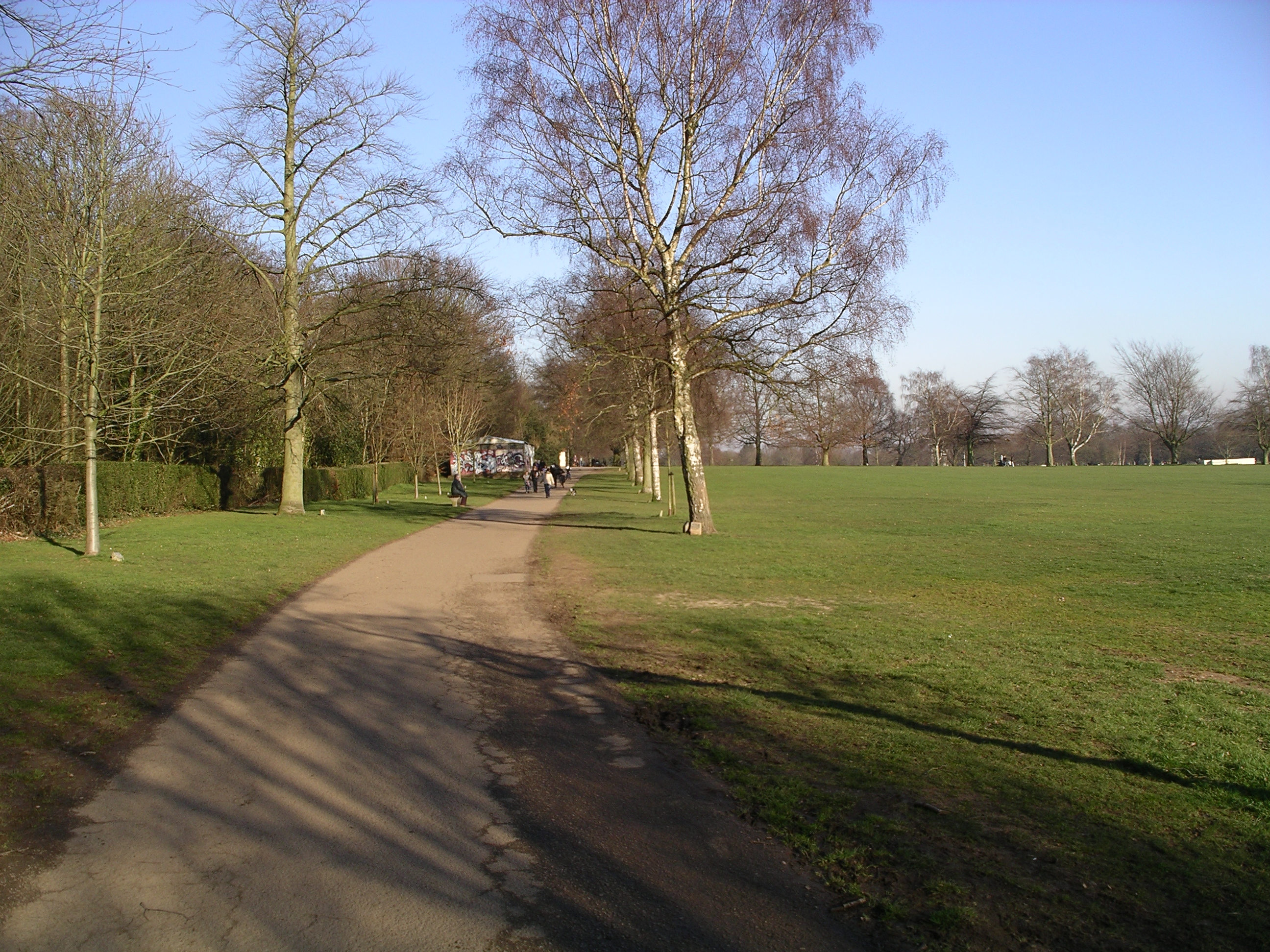
An old section of the perimeter path on the west side of the park

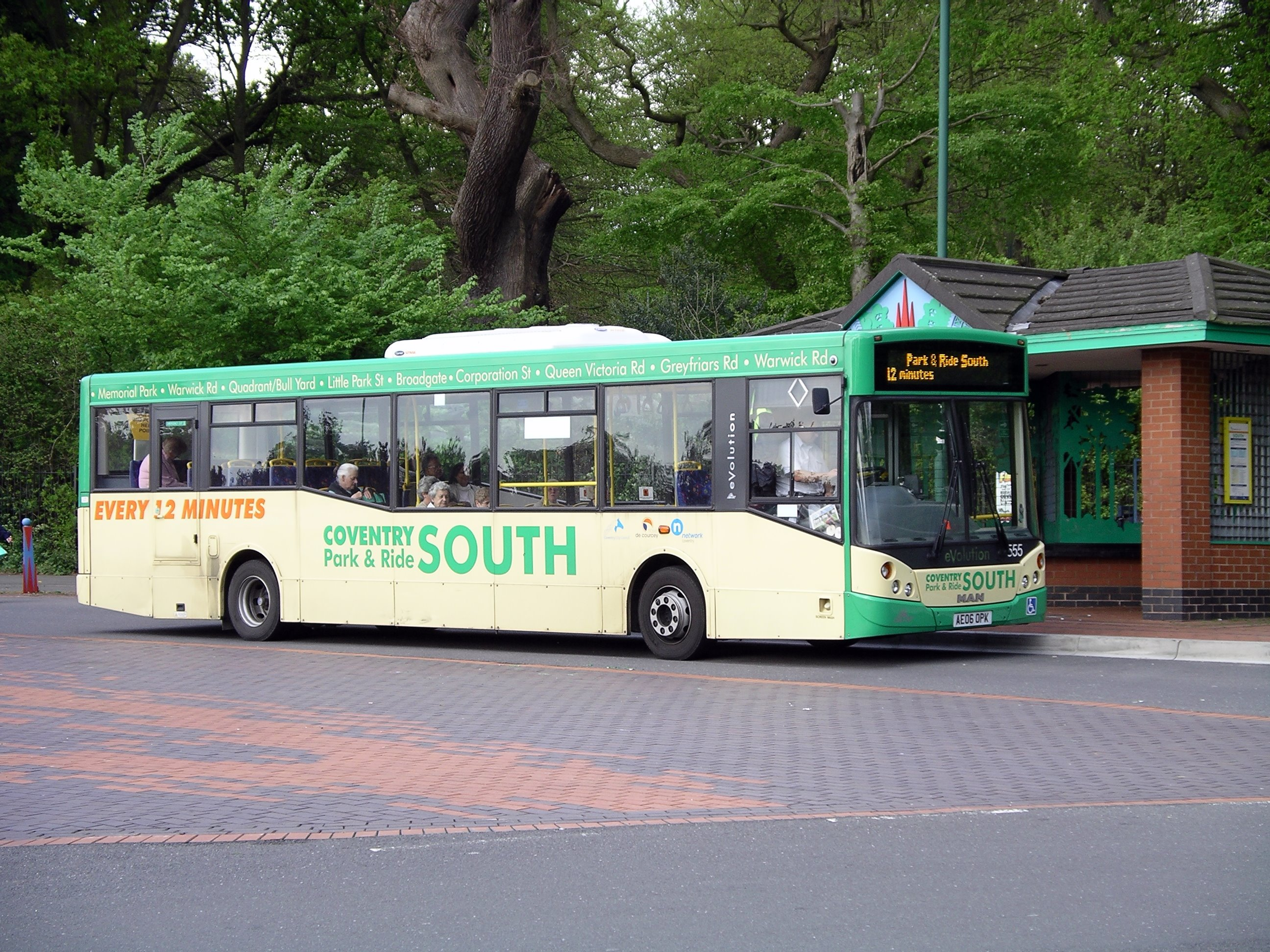
A "park and ride" bus at the bus stop on the western side of the main car park in 2007
