= Coat of Arms (radio play) =

1937 Australian radio play by Alexander Turner

Coat of Arms is a 1937 Australian radio play by Alexander Turner. It was a comedy for two actors. The play was one of Turner's best known.

The 1940 production starred Peter Finch and Muriel Steinbeck (the latter replacing Neva Carr Glynn). Reviewing this Wireless Weekly said "The quiet treatment.. amounted almost to tonelessness in some moments. To a rapt listener, however, such a lack of boisterousness indicates no lack of feeling."

The 1947 production starred Muriel Steinbeck and Leonard Thiele and was directed by Frank Harvey.

Turner sold it to the South African Broadcasting Company.

It was published in a collection of Turner's plays.
