= Stoke Heath, Coventry =

Residential area of Coventry, West Midlands, England

Coordinates: 52.423°N 1.481°W

Stoke Heath
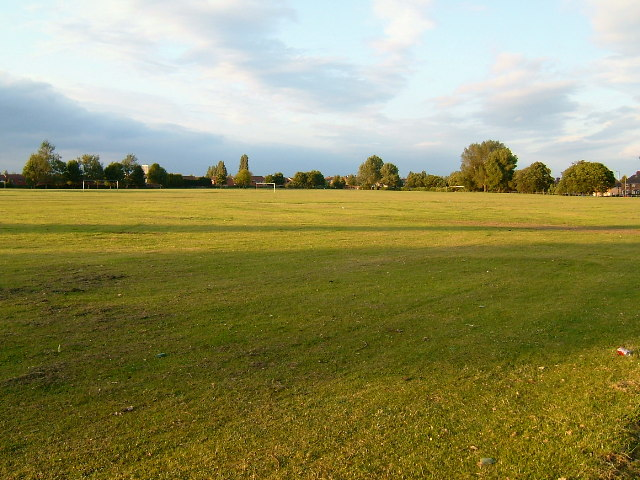

- Location within the West Midlands
- Metropolitan borough: Coventry
- Metropolitan county: West Midlands
- Region: West Midlands
- Country: England
- Sovereign state: United Kingdom
- Police: West Midlands
- Fire: West Midlands
- Ambulance: West Midlands

Stoke Heath is a residential area of Coventry, in the county of the West Midlands, England. It is situated approximately 1 mile (1.6 km) to the north east of the city centre. It borders Courthouse Green to the north, Wyken to the east, Foleshill to the west, and Stoke to the south with its western edge demarcated by the A444.

== History and development ==
The area merited no special mention in medieval records and seems to have been open country and grazing land held by the manors of Wyken and Caludon until the late 17th century. On 3 April 1604 Princess Elizabeth came from Coombe Abbey to Coventry. The Mayor and Aldermen of Coventry met her at "Jabet's Ash on Stoke-green".

The civil parish of Stoke Heath, created out of 74 acres (300,000 m^{2}) in the west of Wyken on 1 October 1920, became part of Coventry on 1 April 1928. In 1921 the parish had a population of 2843. The city of Coventry's population expanded by 90,000 in 1928 due to significant boundary changes. Prior to that date, the district seems to have been referred to as 'Wyken Heath' or 'Wyken Knob'. A vague reference to a Stoke Common around 1700 being one of the first references.

Clay and sand for brickmaking were excavated in Stoke Heath in the early 19th century on sites close to the Coventry Canal. However, the approaching First World War in 1914 would be a major catalyst in Stoke Heath's development.

The district was built up between 1900 and 1920 and was closely tied into the need for munitions workers during the era of Anglo-German rivalry. During the First World War, Stoke Heath played host to a significant population of Belgian refugees. The area was dominated by the popular red brick Stoke Heath Junior & Infants School, built at the end of 1915. The school provided a central focus for the original 689 homes built by 1915. The school was demolished in the 1990s and a new school erected on the same site. The local parish church is St Albans, Church of England, situated in Mercer Avenue and built in 1929 by the architect Harry Bulkeley Creswell.

The original street design for Stoke Heath included large numbers of elm trees, often lining the streets, such as Heath Crescent and Common Way. These became victims of the Dutch elm disease blight which plagued the UK at the end of the 1970s, although the pastoral beginnings of the district are retained in such street names as Blackberry Lane, Little Field, Watersmeet Road and Valley Road.

The Morris Motors factory was the chief employer for many decades of the 20th century and at its height covered several acres in Blackberry Lane. The factory initially made copies of Hotchkiss car engines, and then munitions during the Second World War, before mass-producing engine components for the various incarnations of the Morris Motor Group and British Leyland. The factory met its demise during the recession of the early 1980s and was eventually demolished to make way for new housing at the end of the decade. Another notable landmark was the Barras Pub, well lit and standing back from Heath Crescent. It remained popular with local residents until it too made way for new housing at the turn of the millennium.

Due to its proximity to the Morris Engines motor works and numerous factories in Foleshill and Stoke, the area was badly bombed during the Coventry Blitz in November 1940, with dozens of the city's 568 known victims of that air raid being killed in the Stoke Heath area. The last bombs to fall on Coventry during the Second World War fell on Stoke Heath on 3 August 1942. Anecdotal evidence supports the raid falling on an area stretching from Nuffield Road to upper Valley Road, again aimed at the Morris Engines motor works.

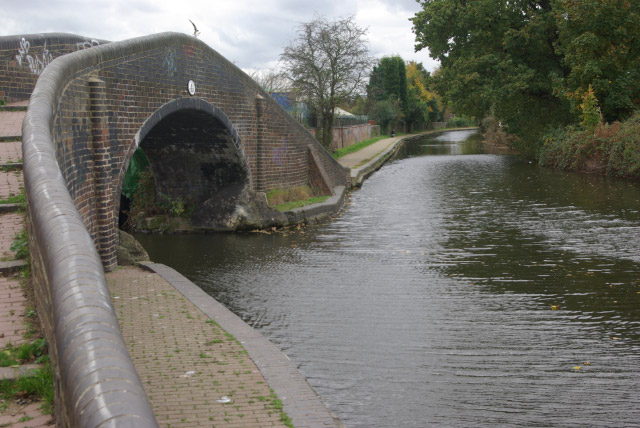
Coventry Canal, Stoke Heath

A small area of the district was home to the notorious "HMV" (Hillside, Meadway, Valley Road) area of housing owned by Whitefriars Housing Association, but this was demolished during 2003-04. The notoriety generated by HMV often reflected poorly on the estate, which in most parts was quiet and residential. However, today much of the former site is completely revitalized and rebranded under the name "Liberty Park". Although in general categorized as an area of "struggling families and low income pensioners" by such geodemographic surveys as ACORN, the greater Stoke Heath area also contains quite a wide variety of "moderate means" housing. Areas of private housing increase generally towards Wyken and can also be found along Swancroft Road and off Blackberry Lane.

The district is dominated by two large commons; Stoke Heath and Barras Heath. Stoke Heath Common in particular was a noted sports venue for many years with four full sized soccer pitches up to 2000. In the 1920s Stoke Heath, like many city parks became a 'war memorial park' with commemorative plaques inscribed with the names of fallen serviceman situated beneath each tree. These were gradually damaged or removed due to municipal developments. Both parks are now given over to general leisure activities. A memorial obelisk was erected in 1933 to commemorate the work of the conservators of the Stoke Commons who helped keep the areas free of development.

A canal boat wharf exists in Swan Lane, along the route of the Coventry Canal, with further development planned for the site in 2009/10. The A444 north-south road greatly improved commuting times between Stoke Heath and the city centre from 2000.

The area has a popular community centre.

== Barras Heath and Courthouse Green ==
Residents closer to Barras Heath Common, with its petrol garage, working men's club and high rise block 'Alpha House', can colloquially refer to the area as 'Barras Heath' or 'Barras Green'; although technically this is not a recognised sub-district of the city. A well known wholesale market once stood on the edge of Barras Heath until it made way for modern warehousing units. The route of Clay Lane, which emerges onto Barras Green road and then Mercer Avenue has medieval origins. At the other end of the district, in the Blackberry Lane area, another blurring of names can take place where the name Courthouse Green, a neighbouring estate, is often used interchangeably with Stoke Heath.

Alpha House is a prominent 17 storey accommodation block also known as 'Jackblock flats'. Built in 1962 by Costain, it was the first example of advanced 'Jackblock' construction. Under the system, the ground-floor slab was cast first and acted as a casting bed for the 17 floors and the roof. Once contractors had completed each floor, they jacked them up a full storey in height at a speed of half a metre per hour.

== Politics ==
Stoke Heath falls within the parliamentary constituency of Coventry East. The current Member of Parliament for the constituency is Mary Creagh (Labour). The Upper Stoke ward returns three local councillors (currently all Labour) to Coventry City Council.

== Education ==
- Stoke Heath Primary School
- Stoke Park School

== Arts and crafts ==
The area plays host to a small amateur theatre in Watersmeet Road, The Wheatsheaf Players Co-Operative Theatre.

== Notable residents ==
- Pop music producer Pete Waterman was born in Burlington Road.
- Terry Hall also resided in the area (The Specials).
