= T. F. Tickner =

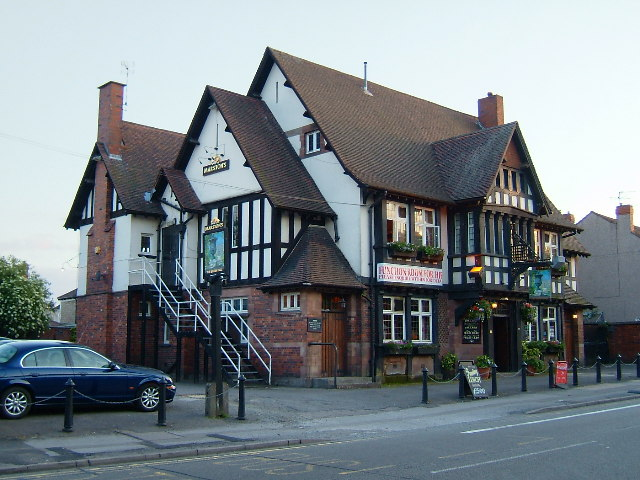
The Biggin Hall, 2005

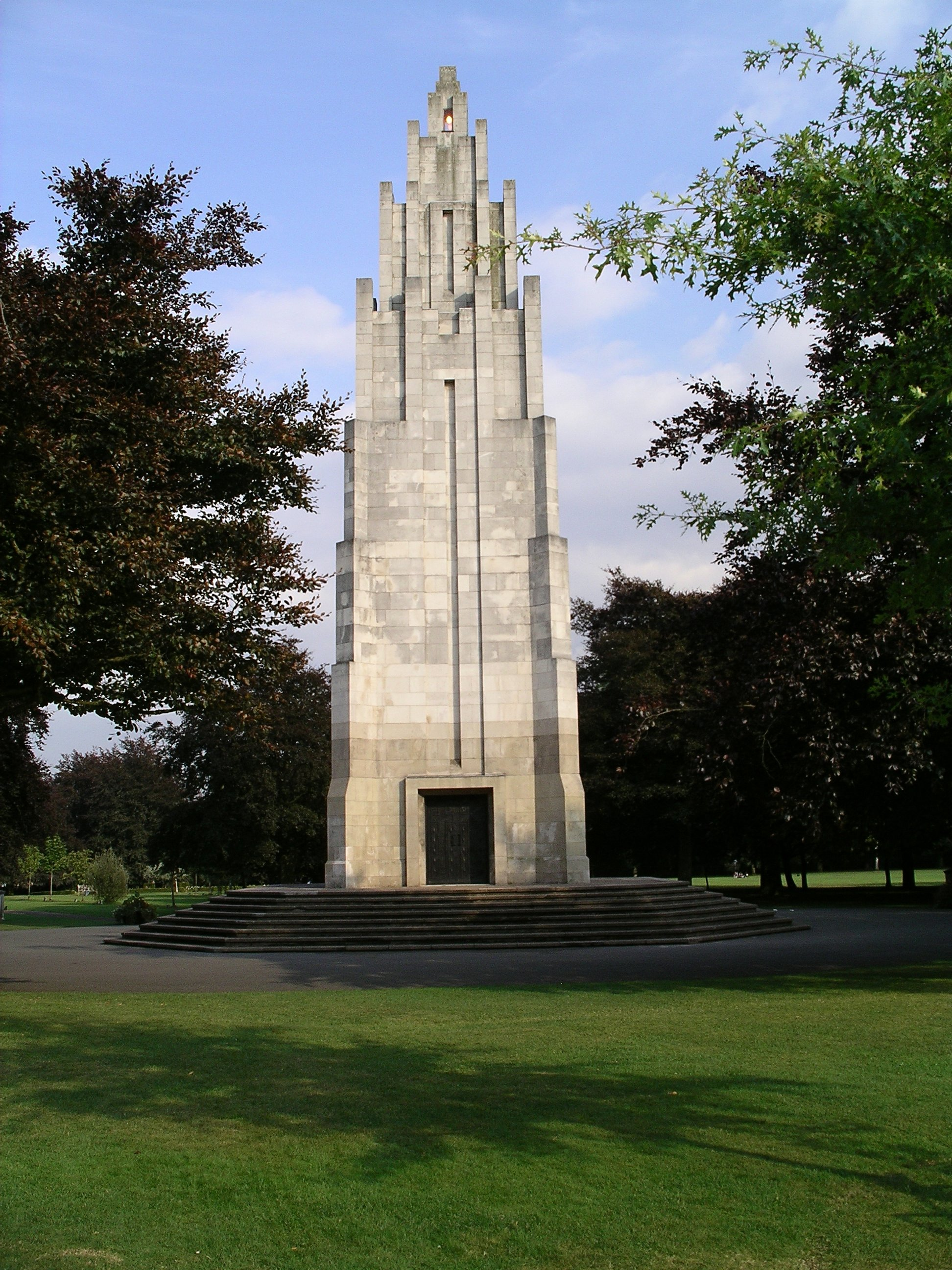
War Memorial, Coventry

Thomas Francis Tickner (1864–1924) was a British architect.

== Early life ==
Thomas Francis Tickner was born in 1864.

== Career ==
Tickner was an architect. He designed The Biggin Hall Hotel, a Grade II listed public house at 214 Binley Road, Coventry, CV3 1HG. It was built in 1921-23 for Marston, Thompson & Evershed, and was Grade II listed in 2015 by Historic England.

He also designed the 90 feet (27 m) high Coventry War Memorial, the most prominent construction in War Memorial Park. It was finished in 1927.

== Death ==
Tickner died in 1924.
