= Coat of Arms Bridge =

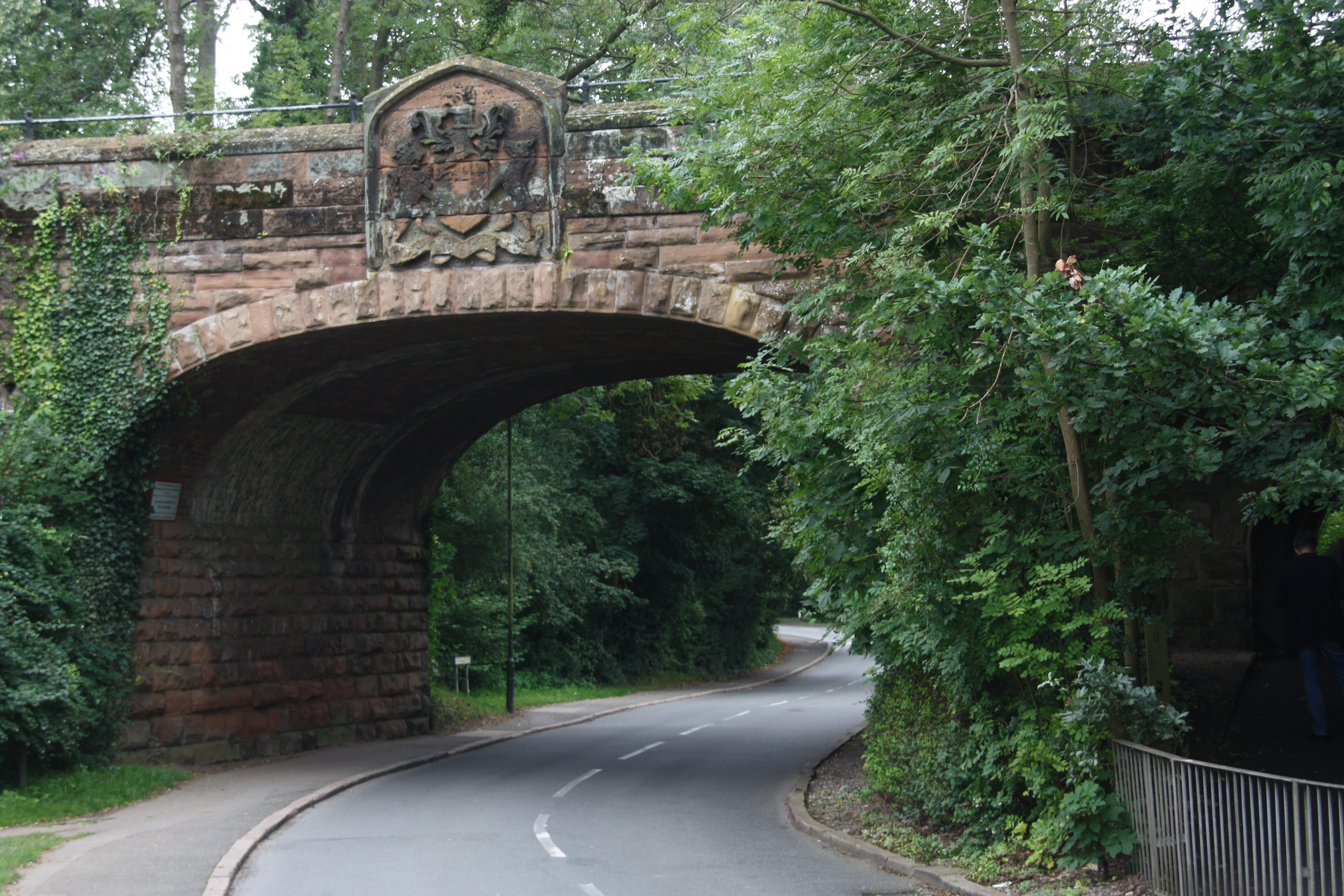
- Coat of Arms Bridge, central span
- Coordinates: 52°23′16″N 1°31′24″W
- Carries: Coventry to Leamington Line
- Crosses: Coat of Arms Bridge Road
- Locale: Stivichall, Coventry, England
- Owner: Network Rail
- Heritage status: Grade II listed building

Characteristics
- Material: Red sandstone
- No. of spans: 3

History
- Architect: R.B. Dockray
- Opened: 1844

The Coat of Arms Bridge is a railway bridge in the Stivichall area of Coventry in the West Midlands of England. It carries the Coventry–Leamington line between Coventry and Leamington Spa and is located just south of Coventry railway station.

== History and description ==
Coventry was served by the London and Birmingham Railway (L&BR) from the 1830s and a branch line south to Leamington was authorised in 1843. The engineer for the line, including the Coat of Arms Bridge, was Robert Dockray, who was one of Stephenson's assistants on the L&BR. The bridge spans a road, on the edge of what is now War Memorial Park, originally known as Cocks Lane but later renamed Coat of Arms Bridge Road.

The bridge has three spans, one semi-elliptical central arch flanked by two smaller supporting arches. The central arch has a span of 30 feet (9.1 metres) and the flanking arches have a span of 20 feet (6.1 metres) each. The side arches were widened in 1916. The structure is built masonry and faced in red sandstone. The bridge takes its name from a shield carved into the parapet wall above the central span, which bears the coat of arms of the Gregory family of Stivichall Manor and the family motto "vigilance". The railway crossed the Gregorys' land and the embellishment on the bridge was possibly compensation.

A similar bridge, an accommodation bridge connecting two fields, exists further down the railway line near Kenilworth. This bridge, also of stone constructions, bears two coats of arms—that of Chandos Leigh, 1st Baron Leigh (the landowner) on one side and the combined coat of arms of his wife and mother-in-law on the other.

The bridge is a Grade II listed building, a status which affords it legal protection, first designated in February 1955. A painting of the bridge by Herbert John Rylance, painted circa 1900, hangs in the Herbert Art Gallery in Coventry city centre.
