= List of people from Coventry =

Location-based list of notable people

This is a list of people from Coventry, a city in the West Midlands region of England. The list is arranged alphabetically by surname.

Table of contents:

A B C D E F G H J K L M N O P R S T W

== A ==
- Jassa Ahluwalia (born 1990), actor, TV and radio presenter
- Bob Ainsworth (born 1952), Labour Party politician, Member of Parliament for Coventry North East and Secretary of State for Defence
- Alice Arnold (1881–1955), politician, trade unionist and first female mayor of Coventry
- John Ash (1723–1798), English physician and founder of Birmingham General Hospital
- Martin Atkins (born 1959) drummer in post-punk and industrial groups Public Image Ltd, Ministry, Nine Inch Nails, Pigface, and Killing Joke

== B ==
- Neil Back (born 1969), rugby union player who played 66 times for England
- Angela Bailey (1962–2021), Canadian track and field athlete and Olympic medallist
- Gillian Barber (born 1958), actress
- Jessica Barry (born 1994), super featherweight boxer
- Ian Bell (born 1982), Warwickshire and England cricketer
- John Bird (1694–1771), Member of Parliament for Coventry (born in Kenilworth)
- John Blakemore (born 1936), photographer
- Sara Blizzard (born 1970), weather presenter
- Jordan Bolger (born 1994), actor
- Laurence Boswell, (born 1959), Olivier Award-winning theatre director.
- John Bradbury (1953 –2015), drummer of the 2-tone band the Specials
- Charles Bray (1811–1884), ribbon manufacturer, social reformer and phrenologist
- Albert Brown (1858–1930), Coventry's first England international footballer
- Olivia Broadfield (born 1981), singer-songwriter for TV and film
- Sydney John Bunney (1877–1928), impressionist artist
- Jocelyn Burgener (born 1949), businesswoman and Canadian politician
- Joseph Butterworth (1770–1826), law bookseller, philanthropist, politician and Member of Parliament for Coventry from 1812 to 1818

== C ==
- Sheila Carey (born 1946), middle-distance runner and Olympian
- Samuel Carter (1805–1878), solicitor and Member of Parliament for Coventry
- Tom Cartwright (1935–2007), Warwickshire and England cricketer
- Cathy Cassidy (born 1962), children's writer
- William Chattaway (1927–2019), sculptor and draughtsman
- Fontaine Chapman (born 1990), badminton player
- Lee Child (born 1954), novelist best known for his Jack Reacher series
- David Clements (born 1994), ice hockey player for Coventry Blaze and the British men's national team
- Paul Clews (born 1979), motorcycle speedway rider
- Rowena Cole (born 1992), middle distance runner
- Anketil de Coleshull (active in 1295), first known Member of Parliament for Coventry
- Ray Colledge (1922–2014), mountaineer
- Cyril Connolly (1903–1974), literary critic and writer
- William of Coventry (active c.1340–1360), Carmelite friar and historian
- Lauren Cox (swimmer)(born 2001), swimmer|
- Mary Creagh (born 1967), Labour Party politician and Member of Parliament for Coventry East
- Cyrus Christie (born 1992), footballer
- Cal Crutchlow (born 1985), MotoGP motorcycle racer

== D ==
- Dominic Dale (born 1971), professional snooker player and commentator for the BBC and Eurosport
- Christopher Davenport (1598–1680), Catholic theologian, religious controversialist, and royal chaplain
- Dame Laura Davies (born 1963), professional golfer
- Neol Davies (born 1952), guitarist of 2 tone band the Selecter
- Peter Ho Davies (born 1966), writer
- Delia Derbyshire (1937–2001), composer of electronic music and creator of the theme music to the BBC TV series Doctor Who
- Marlon Devonish (born 1976), sprinter and Olympic gold medallist
- Lisa Dillon (born 1979), actress
- Reg Dixon (1915–1984), comedian
- Yvonne Dolphin-Cooper (born 1956), cricket umpire and member of the first-all female umpiring duo in ECB Premier League history
- Lee Dorrian (born 1968), heavy metal musician of bands Napalm Death, Cathedral, Septic Tank and With the Dead
- Thomas Edward Dunville (1867–1924) music hall comedian

== E ==
- Mary Eaves (c. 1805/6–1875), midwife
- Josh Eccles (born 2000), footballer for Coventry City F.C.
- Thomas Edwards (1729–1785), Anglican clergyman, divine and writer
- George Eld (1791–1862), antiquary and editor of the Coventry Standard
- Evelyn Evans (1910–2005), British librarian who founded libraries in Ghana
- John Eyre (born 1771), painter and engraver, transported to New South Wales as a convict

== F ==
- Nan Fairbrother (1913–1971), writer and environmentalist
- Tom Farndon (1910–1935), speedway rider
- Jade Faulkner (born 1993), gymnast and Olympian
- Colleen Fletcher (born 1954), Labour Party politician and Member of Parliament for Coventry North East
- Richard Forster (c.1546–1616), physician and astrologer
- Danusia Francis (born 1994), gymnast and Olympian
- Mary Franklin (1800–1867), schoolmistress
- Connie Frazer (1925–2002), poet and writer
- Emma Fryer (born 1980), comedian and actress

== G ==
- Cathy Galvin (born 1959), poet and journalist
- David Gee (1793–1872), oil painter
- Frederick Gibberd (1908–1984), English architect, town planner and landscape designer
- Chelsie Giles (born 1997), judoka and Olympic medallist
- Neelam Gill (born 1995), international fashion model
- Lady Godiva (died between 1066 and 1086), Anglo-Saxon noblewoman and figure of legend
- Andy Goode (born 1980), former England international rugby union fly-half
- Bobby Gould (born 1946), former footballer and manager
- Melissa Graham (born 1975), singer-songwriter in band Solid HarmoniE
- Danny Grewcock (born 1972), rugby union lock who played for England
- Theresa Griffin (born 1962), Labour Party politician and former Member of the European Parliament for the North West England constituency
- Alfred Robert Grindlay (1876–1965), inventor, industrialist and politician
- Joseph Gutteridge (1816–1899), silk weaver, microscopist and naturalist

== H ==
- Terry Hall (1959–2022), lead singer of the 2-tone band the Specials
- Stewart Harcourt (b. 1968) screenwriter
- Mary Dormer Harris (1867–1936), local historian, translator, writer and suffragist
- Nigel Hawthorne (1929–2001), actor
- Vince Hill (1934-2023), traditional pop music singer and songwriter
- Edward Hopkins (c. 1675 – 1736), Whig Member of Parliament for Coventry
- Gabriel Holland (died 1761), watch and clock maker, subsequently a coal mine proprietor in Leicestershire.
- Amy Hurlston (1865–1949), journalist, editor, social campaigner, suffragist and trade unionist

== I ==
- Frank Ifield (1937-2024), English-Australian country music singer, yodeller and guitarist
- Langton Iliffe, 2nd Baron Iliffe, businessman and peer; owned the controlling interests in newspapers in Birmingham and Coventry, including the Birmingham Post, the Birmingham Mail and the Coventry Evening Telegraph
- Harold Innocent (1933–1993), actor

== J ==
- Margot James (born 1957), Conservative Party politician, former Member of Parliament for Stourbridge and Minister of State for Digital and Creative Industries
- William Jesson (1580–1651), dyer, politician and former Member of Parliament for Coventry in the Short Parliament
- Yasmin Javadian (born 2000), judoka and Commonwealth Games medallist
- JAY1 (born 1998), rapper and songwriter
- Dominic Jephcott (born 1957), actor
- Sally Jones (born 1955), tennis player, writer and TV presenter
- Gillian Joseph (born 1969), newscaster and weekend anchor of Sky News at Ten
- Graham Joyce (1954–2014), fantasy and speculative fiction writer

== K ==
- Jackie Kabler (born 1966), TV presenter and writer
- Tamla Kari (born 1988), actress
- Charlotte Kelly (born 1977), singer and member of R&B group Soul II Soul
- Richard Keys (born 1957), sports TV presenter
- Guz Khan (born 1986), comedian and actor
- Sarah Jane Kirk (1829–1916), New Zealand temperance leader, suffragist and human rights activist
- Thomas Kirk (1828–1898), New Zealand botanist, teacher, public servant, writer and churchman
- Aimee Knight (born 1997), former Green Party and Liberal Democrats politician and transgender activist
- Neil Kulkarni (1972–2024), music critic and writer

== L ==
- Billy Lane (1922–1980), angler and author
- Philip Larkin (1922–1985), poet, novelist, and librarian
- Lisa Lashes (born 1971), music producer and electronic dance music DJ
- John David Lawson (1923–2008), engineer and physicist
- Jen Ledger (born 1989), drummer and co-vocalist of the Christian rock band Skillet
- Amanda Lightfoot (born 1987), biathlete
- Yasmin Liverpool (born 1999), 200m and 400m sprinter
- Leon Lloyd (born 1977), retired English rugby union footballer, played for Leicester Tigers
- Alice Lowe (born 1977), actress, screenwriter and film director

== M ==
- Sharon Maguire (born 1960), film director best known for directing Bridget Jones's Diary
- Margery Manners (1926–1997), music hall performer and TV actress
- Clint Mansell (born 1963), lead singer of rock band Pop Will Eat Itself and film music composer
- Tom Mann (1856–1941), trade unionist and activist
- John Marquez (born 1970), actor
- Ian Marter (1944–1986), actor
- Beverley Martyn (born 1947), folk rock singer, songwriter and guitarist
- Dame Clare Marx (1954–2022), surgeon and former president of the Royal College of Surgeons of England
- Sian Massey-Ellis (born 1985), football referee in English Premier and Football Leagues
- Brian Matthew (1928–2017), BBC Radio 2 broadcaster
- Reg Matthews (1933–2001), England football goalkeeper
- Sinead Matthews (born 1980), actress
- Panjabi MC (born 1970), recording artist, rapper, record producer and DJ
- Dave McCalla (born 1973), GB 4-man Bobsleigh Athlete, Olympian. Competed at 2002 Winter Olympic Games, Salt Lake City Utah
- Jamie McGough, former boxer turned playwright
- Millie McKenzie (born 2000), professional wrestler and longest reigning CPW Women’s Champion
- Carla Mendonça (born 1961), actress
- Clara Milburn (1883–1961), diarist and housewife whose writing gives an insight into domestic life during the Second World War
- Brian Mitchell (born 1967), Australian Labor Party politician
- David Moorcroft (born 1953), athlete, Olympian and former world record holder for the men's 5,000 metres
- Mo Mowlam (1949-2005), British Labour Politician and Government Minister |
- Billie Myers (born 1971), pop singer best known for her hit song Kiss the Rain

== N ==
- John Neale (1687–1746), Member of Parliament for Coventry
- Dave Nellist (born 1952), Militant tendency politician in the Labour Party, former Member of Parliament for Coventry South East and current National Chair of the Trade Unionist and Socialist Coalition (TUSC)
- Rhoda Holmes Nicholls (1854–1930), watercolour and oil painter
- Simon Norton (1578–1641), dyer, politician and Member of Parliament for Coventry

== O ==
- Hazel O'Connor (born 1954), singer-songwriter and actress
- Patricia O'Connor (born 1941), soccer player and captain of the first Australia women's national soccer team
- Christine Oddy (1955–2014), Labour Party politician and former Member of the European Parliament for the Midlands Central constituency
- Adolphus Oughton (1685–1736), Member of Parliament for Coventry (born in Tachbrook)
- Clive Owen (born 1964), actor

== P ==
- Julins Palmer (d. 1556), English Protestant martyr
- Henry Parkes (1815–1896), statesman and founder of modern Australia
- Robin Parkinson (1929–2022), actor
- Bharti Patel, actress
- Elizabeth Percival (1906–1997), research chemist
- April Phillips (born 1965), screenwriter, director and producer of film and theatre
- Jill Phipps (1964–1995), animal rights activist
- Alan Pollock (born 1962), playwright
- Pamela Vandyke Price (1923–2014), wine expert and writer

== R ==
- Roddy Radiation (born 1955), lead guitarist of the 2-tone band the Specials
- Julianne Regan (born 1962), lead singer and songwriter of the rock band All About Eve
- Ann Rollason (1760s–1846), printer and bookseller who published the Coventry Mercury newspaper from 1813 to 1846
- Alison Rose (born 1961), former diplomat and British ambassador to Belgium
- Roy Rutherford (born 1973), boxer who held the British featherweight title in 2003 and the English super featherweight title from 2004 to 2005

== S ==
- Selaine Saxby (born 1970), Conservative Party politician and former Member of Parliament for North Devon
- Doc Scott (born 1971), drum and bass DJ and producer, also known as Nasty Habits
- Henry Sewall (1544–1628), draper, politician and former Member of Parliament
- Ciara Sexton (born 1988), Irish dancer and choreographer
- Thomas Sharp (1770– 1841), antiquary
- George Shaw (artist) (born 1966), Turner prize nominated artist |
- Eileen Sheridan (1923–2023), road record-breaking cyclist
- Tarsame "Taz" Singh Saini (1967–2022), lead singer of the band Stereo Nation
- Rachel Smith (born 1993), rhythmic gymnast and Olympian
- James Starley (1830-1881), inventor and father of the bicycle industry.
- Thomas Stevens (1828–1888), weaver and inventor of Stevengraph woven silk pictures
- Graham Stevenson (1950–2020), trade union leader and former National Secretary for the Transport and General Workers' Union (TGWU)
- Graham Sykes (1937–2008), competitive swimmer and Olympian
- Graham Symonds (1937–2006), competitive swimmer and Olympian

== T ==
- Les Tarrant (1903–1979), bantamweight boxer and Olympian
- Dick Taylor (born 1945), long distance runner and Olympian
- Dame Ellen Terry (1847–1928), leading English actress of the late 19th and early 20th centuries
- Conor Thomas (born 1993), Coventry City footballer
- Freya Thomas (born 2001), footballer
- Peter Thomas (1944–2023), footballer who made two international appearances for the Republic of Ireland
- Geoff Thompson (born 1960), BAFTA-winning writer and martial artist.
- Donald Trelford (1937–2023), editor of The Observer newspaper from 1975 to 1993

== V ==
- Joseph Vernon (1738–1782), boy soprano and actor
- Manjinder Virk (born 1975), actress, director and writer

== W ==
- George Wagstaffe (born 1930), sculptor
- Rowena Wallace (born 1947), actress
- Melissa Walton (born 1990), actress
- Kevin Warwick (born 1954), cybernetics scientist
- Pete Waterman (born 1947), record producer, songwriter, radio and club DJ and television presenter
- John Watts (1818–1887), educational and social reformer
- Billie Whitelaw (1932–2014), actress
- Tony Whittaker (1932–2016), solicitor and politician, co-founder and first leader of PEOPLE, forerunner of the Ecology Party and Green Party UK
- Sir Frank Whittle (1907–1996), inventor of the jet engine
- Daphne Wilkinson (born 1932), freestyle swimmer and Olympian
- Arthur Wills (1926–2020), composer, organist and Director of Music at Ely Cathedral (1958–1990)
- Callum Wilson (born 1992), footballer
- River Wilson-Bent (born 1994), middleweight boxer
- Mark Wood (born 1966), explorer
- Tom Wood (born 1986), rugby union flanker
- Hilda Woodward (1913–1999), pianist for the band Lieutenant Pigeon

== Z ==
- Salma Zahid (born 1970), Liberal Party of Canada politician

== See also ==
- List of commemorative plaques in Coventry
