= List of public art in Coventry =

This is a list of public art in Coventry, in the West Midlands, England. This list applies only to works of public art accessible in an outdoor public space. For example, this does not include artwork visible inside a museum.

== Central Coventry ==
=== Coventry Cathedral ===
Image	Title / subject	Location and coordinates	Date	Artist / designer	Type	Material	Dimensions	Designation	Owner / administrator	Notes
More images	St Michael's Victory over the Devil	Coventry Cathedral 52.408217°N 1.50695°W	1958	Sir Jacob Epstein	Sculpture	Bronze			Coventry Cathedral	
More images	Reconciliation	Coventry Cathedral ruins 52.408047°N 1.507478°W	1995	Josefina de Vasconcellos	Statues	Bronze			Coventry Cathedral	
More images	Ecce Homo	South wall of Coventry Cathedral ruins 52.407824°N 1.507607°W approx	1969	Sir Jacob Epstein	Sculpture	Subiaco marble			Coventry Cathedral	
	Christ	Coventry Cathedral ruins	After 1943	Alain John		Concrete			Coventry Cathedral	
	Choir of Survivors	Coventry Cathedral ruins 52.408105°N 1.507868°W	2012	Helmut Heinze		Bronze			Coventry Cathedral	

=== Herbert Art Gallery and Museum ===
Image	Title / subject	Location and coordinates	Date	Artist / designer	Type	Material	Dimensions	Designation	Owner / administrator	Notes
More images	Elisabeth Frink	Herbert Art Gallery and Museum – near Jordan Well, Coventry 52.407073°N 1.505975°W	1956	F. E. McWilliam	Statue	Bronze			Herbert Art Gallery and Museum	
More images	Man's Struggle	Herbert Art Gallery and Museum – Jordan Well, Coventry 52.407013°N 1.505369°W	1959	Walter Ritchie	Relief Mural	Portland stone			Herbert Art Gallery and Museum	
More images	The Enfolding	Herbert Art Gallery and Museum, Coventry – Peace Garden, Coventry 52.407637°N 1.506523°W	1985	Jean Parker	Sculpture	Bath stone	180 cm high		Herbert Art Gallery and Museum	Formerly in Smithford Way was relocated to this Peace Garden in November 1990
More images	Mother and Children	Herbert Art Gallery and Museum – Bayley Lane, Coventry 52.407119°N 1.506535°W	1986	Gary Galpin	Sculpture	Bath stone			Herbert Art Gallery and Museum	
	Peace Stone	Herbert Art Gallery and Museum 52.40734°N 1.5066°W	1990		Sculpture	Stone, bronze			Herbert Art Gallery and Museum	
	Barra Suite 5	Herbert Art Gallery and Museum	1992	Dr. Tim Threlfall	Sculpture				Herbert Art Gallery and Museum	

=== Millennium Place ===
Image	Title / subject	Location and coordinates	Date	Artist / designer	Type	Material	Dimensions	Designation	Owner / administrator	Notes
More images	Sir Frank Whittle	Millennium Place, Coventry 52.410263°N 1.508552°W	2007	Faith Winter	Statue	Bronze			Coventry City Council	
More images	Whittle Arch	Millennium Place, Coventry 52.410445°N 1.508811°W	2002		Sculpture	Stainless steel			Coventry City Council	
More images	The Public Bench	Millennium Place, Coventry 52.410753°N 1.508973°W	1998	Jochen Gerz					Coventry City Council	
More images	The Future Monument	Millennium Place, Coventry 52.410585°N 1.508281°W		Jochen Gerz	Obelisk	Glass			Coventry City Council	

=== Coventry Council House ===
Image	Title / subject	Location and coordinates	Date	Artist / designer	Type	Material	Dimensions	Designation	Owner / administrator	Notes
	Leofric, Godiva and Justice	Coventry Council House 52.407083°N 1.508099°W	1920	Henry Wilson		Portland stone			Coventry City Council	
	Flywheel	Outside Coventry Magistrate's Court 52.4062°N 1.50822°W	1987	Michael Farrell					Coventry City Council	

=== Greyfriars Green ===
Image	Title / subject	Location and coordinates	Date	Artist / designer	Type	Material	Dimensions	Designation	Owner / administrator	Notes
More images	The James Starley Memorial	Greyfriars Green, Coventry 52.404205°N 1.515212°W	1884	Joseph Whitehead and Sons	Memorial Statue	Granite, Ravaccione marble	Plinth: Overall height 600cm, plinth width 366cm. Figure: 150cm high. Panels/second stage: 200cm high x 96cm wide x 96cm deep. Column: 80cm high approx.		Coventry City Council	The inventor of the bicycle in 1870.
More images	The Thomas White Memorial	Greyfriars Green, Coventry 52.404749°N 1.513828°W	1883	W. W. Wills and T. W. Wills	Statue	Cornish granite, Sicilian marble	Pedestal: 305cm high. Statue: 228cm high		Coventry City Council	
More images	Bucephalus	Greyfriars Green, Coventry 52.404042°N 1.514784°W	1986	Simon Evans	Prancing horse sculpture	scrap metal, coated black	h 365cm		Coventry City Council	Formerly on Ring Road. Re-sited on Greyfriars Green 7 Feb 2018. Was removed in 2014 and restored by the sculptor Andy Langley, before being resited here.

=== Broadgate, Hertford Street and Upper Precinct ===
Image	Title / subject	Location and coordinates	Date	Artist / designer	Type	Material	Dimensions	Designation	Owner / administrator	Notes
More images	Self Sacrifice (Lady Godiva)	Broadgate, Coventry 52.408032°N 1.510402°W	1949	William Reid Dick	Equestrian statue	Bronze and stone		Grade II* listed	Coventry City Council	
	Godiva and Peeping Tom Clock	Broadgate House – Broadgate, Coventry 52.407588°N 1.510682°W	1953	Trevor Tennant	Clock sculpture	Painted wood			Coventry City Council	
	The People of Coventry	Broadgate House – Hertford Street, Coventry 52.407454°N 1.510634°W	1953	Trevor Tennant	Panel, sculpture	Doulting stone	Each group: 300cm x 91cm x 46cm		Coventry City Council	Four panels, placed between the windows of the former Bridge Restaurant, each representing two standing figures depicting Coventry past, present and future.
	Broadgate Standard	Broadgate, entrance to Upper Precinct, Coventry 52.40803°N 1.51092°W	1948	British Pressed Panels Ltd		Aluminium			Coventry City Council	
	Peeping Tom	Hertford Street, Coventry 52.406577°N 1.511642°W approx	1972			Painted wood			Coventry City Council	
	Naiad	Upper Precinct 52.40815°N 1.51169°W	1981-3 (replaced 1958 original)	George Wagstaffe		Bronze			Coventry City Council	The first public art commission in Coventry, after World War II. Relocated in 2021 to the Upper Precinct during Coventry UK City of Culture 2021

=== Bull Yard ===
Image	Title / subject	Location and coordinates	Date	Artist / designer	Type	Material	Dimensions	Designation	Owner / administrator	Notes
More images	The Phoenix	Bull Yard & Hertford Street, Coventry 52.406110°N 1.512326°W	1987	George Wagstaffe	Statue	Bronze	237cm x 150cm x 60cm		Coventry City Council	The sculpture represents the city's post-war story. It symbolises the young of the new city rising from the flames of the old city. The phoenix is in the form of a winged woman, her wings raised above her head, they cumulate in sharp points.
	Thread Through Time	Bull Yard, Coventry 52.406127°N 1.512927°W	1999	Robert Conybear and Uta Molling	Cone sculpture	Cast recycled concrete, stone and brick	3.9m high approx (plus 6m of laser).		Coventry City Council	Carved and painted cone which emits a laser beam up some 6 metres up into the night sky.
	Sir Guy and the Dun Cow	Above the pavement between Shelton Square and Bull Yard in the precinct, Coventry 52.406208°N 1.513291°W	1952	Alma Ramsey	Sculpture	Stone mix covered in paint	200cm high x 250cm wide		Coventry City Council	

=== Coventry University ===
Image	Title / subject	Location and coordinates	Date	Artist / designer	Type	Material	Dimensions	Designation	Owner / administrator	Notes
More images	The Coventry Boy	Outside the Students Union – Coventry University – Priory Street, Coventry 52.408378°N 1.506289°W	1966	Philip Bentham	Statue	Bronze and sandstone			Coventry City Council	
More images	Graham Sutherland Building sculpture	Coventry School of Art and Design – Graham Sutherland Building – Coventry University 52.40726°N 1.503178°W			Sculpture	Steel			Coventry University	
More images	Basilica	Coventry Combined Court Centre – Much Park Street, Coventry 52.406268°N 1.506007°W	1991	Paul de Monchaux	Sculpture	Purbeck and Portland limestone, and Frankland Grey Granite	280cm high x 300cm wide x 230cm deep approx.		Coventry Combined Court Centre	
	The Phoenix Tree	University Square, Coventry University 52.40811°N 1.50626°W	January 17, 2024	George Wagstaffe	Sculpture	Bronze			Coventry University	It pays tribute to Coventry's history and future, unveiled in Coventry University's new peace garden.

=== Belgrade Theatre ===
Image	Title / subject	Location and coordinates	Date	Artist / designer	Type	Material	Dimensions	Designation	Owner / administrator	Notes
	Belgrade	Belgrade Theatre – Corporation Street, Coventry 52.409671°N 1.513903°W	1958	James C Brown	Relief panel	Cast cement fondu with Penmaenware granite chippings for aggregate	305cm x 230cm		Belgrade Theatre	
More images	A memorial to Bryan Bailey	Belgrade Theatre – Upper Well Street, Coventry 52.409972°N 1.513752°W	1962 (recast in bronze 2008)	Norelle Keddie	Memorial sculpture	Bronze			Belgrade Theatre	Bryan Bailey was the first director of the Belgrade Theatre in Coventry. After the development of a new public space, it was returned here in 2009

=== Other city centre areas ===
Image	Title / subject	Location and coordinates	Date	Artist / designer	Type	Material	Dimensions	Designation	Owner / administrator	Notes
More images	Coventry Cross	Cuckoo Lane, Coventry (until 2021). Broadgate (from 2023) 52.408197°N 1.508581°W	1976 - 2021, 2023	George Wagstaffe	Market cross	Ferro-concrete, Hollington stone, anodised aluminium, fibreglass			Coventry City Council	Removed and dismantled between 2019 and 2021. Replaced by a new replica in 2023.
	Mary and Jesus	St Mary's Priory and Cathedral ruins 52.40892°N 1.50849°W	2001		Statue	Bronze			Coventry City Council	
	Rebuilding Coventry and the Co-op's Activities	Co-operative Society Building – Corporation Street, Coventry 52.409167°N 1.514065°W	1956	John Skelton	incised line drawings on several of the columns	Hornton stone	366cm x 61cm		Coventry City Council	
	Coventry's Industries	Lower Precinct, Coventry 52.408212°N 1.514687°W	1958 and 1961	Arthur Ling	Panels	Neon tubes	200cm x 300cm approx.		Coventry City Council	The clock panel (pictured) is permanently lit, the other panels are lit in the evening.
	Growth of the City	Sainsbury's – Trinity Street, Coventry 52.409777°N 1.509011°W	1964	John Skelton	diagrammatic map	Swedish pearl granite, part painted	335cm x 275cm		Coventry City Council	Not visible on the outside of the building

=== Coventry Ring Road ===
Image	Title / subject	Location and coordinates	Date	Artist / designer	Type	Material	Dimensions	Designation	Owner / administrator	Notes
	Untitled Sculpture	Lamb Street, Coventry (near Ringway St Nicholas) 52.411803°N 1.513362°W	1973	John Bridgeman	Sculpture	Resin, bronze powder	Sculpture: 219cm high x 65cm wide x 30cm deep. Pedestal: 26cm high x 112cm wide x 94cm deep		Coventry City Council	An organically shaped abstract sculpture coloured in muted tones.
	Coventry Martyrs Memorial	Ringway, St Patrick's, Coventry 52.403567°N 1.50821°W	1910	G. Maile and Sons		Granite and metal			Coventry City Council	The memorial is in the form of a Celtic wheelhead cross, mounted on a stepped plinth.

== Coventry Canal ==
Image	Title / subject	Location and coordinates	Date	Artist / designer	Type	Material	Dimensions	Designation	Owner / administrator	Notes
More images	James Brindley	Coventry Canal Basin 52.413342°N 1.511626°W	1998	James Butler	Statue	Bronze			Coventry City Council	
	Canal Basin Mosaic	Coventry Canal Basin 52.41347°N 1.512162°W	1997	Rosalind Wates	mosaic	Unglazed ceramic tiles			Coventry City Council	
	Lock Gates	Foleshill roundabout, Junction 1 of the Ring Road 52.41315°N 1.51008°W	1997	Ondré Nowakowski		Oak			Coventry City Council	
	Entry and Parapet Markers	Six freestanding and four parapet markers at various locations from Canal Basin to Hawkesbury Junction	1999	Jon Mills		Painted galvanised steel			Coventry City Council	
More images	The Journeyman	Leicester Row, north of Bridge No 1	1999	Stephen Hitchin		Steel, cast bronze			Coventry City Council	
	Wave Seat	Leicester Row, north of Bridge No 1	1998	Michael Grevatte		Hornton stone			Coventry City Council	
	Daimler Heritage Marker	Canalside, opposite Sandy Lane Business Park 52.41703°N 1.51164°W	1997	Robert Crutchley		Bronze, granite			Coventry City Council	
	The Coil	Adjacent to Prince William Henry Bridge 52.42298°N 1.50372°W	1997	Frank Triggs		Sweet chestnut			Coventry City Council	
	'Pleasure Craft'.	Tom Mann Close, off Lady Lane 52.452190°N 1.487338°W	1997	Tim Shutter	Public Art	Stanton Moor Sandstone	111 x 178 x 195 cm		Coventry City Council	The work depicts a stone sofa with integral oar rack on a stone raft, ready to be launched into the canal.
	Wings Over Water	Hawksbury Bridge 52.4574°N 1.4705°W	2000	Walenty Pytel		Galvanized Steel			Coventry City Council	Wings over Water Gateway sculpture on canal footbridge Commissioned by:-Coventry City Council, Groundwork Company. Hawkesbury Junction, Coventry.

== Suburban Coventry ==
=== Coventry Building Society Arena ===
Image	Title / subject	Location and coordinates	Date	Artist / designer	Type	Material	Dimensions	Designation	Owner / administrator	Notes
More images	Jimmy Hill	Near the Club Store & Ticket office at Coventry Building Society Arena 52.44919921640445°N 1.4959414191493907°W	July 28, 2011	Nicolas Dimbleby	Statues	Bronze	7ft high		Coventry City Football Club	Former manager of Coventry City FC, he helped the club's promotion to the old Division One in 1967.
More images	George Curtis and John Sillett	Near south entrance of Coventry Building Society Arena 52.447068537669594°N 1.4955369430763088°W	April 17, 2025	Douglas Jennings	Statues	Bronze			Coventry City Football Club	Celebrates Coventry City FC winning the FA Cup in May 1987.

=== Earlsdon ===
Image	Title / subject	Location and coordinates	Date	Artist / designer	Type	Material	Dimensions	Designation	Owner / administrator	Notes
More images	Resting Kestrel	Millennium Green, Canley Ford, Earlsdon 52.39045°N 1.5401°W	2000	Walenty Pytel	Sculpture	Welded steel	H 240cm		Coventry City Council	Depicts a resting kestrel. It was commissioned by the Friends of Canley Ford.

=== Foleshill ===
Image	Title / subject	Location and coordinates	Date	Artist / designer	Type	Material	Dimensions	Designation	Owner / administrator	Notes
	Foleshill Blue Ribbon	On roundabout at junction of Foleshill Road and A444 52.435748982710244°N 1.4941676740346712°W	1997	Andrew Dwyer	Sculpture	Steel	Height 10.67 m		Coventry City Council	Represents the ribbon industry in Coventry. Original design by William Farrell, a student from Foxford School

== Removed to storage ==
Image	Title / subject	Location and coordinates	Date	Artist / designer	Type	Material	Dimensions	Designation	Owner / administrator	Notes
More images	Three Tuns	Was at Bull Yard	1966	William Mitchell	Sculpture	Concrete		Grade II	Coventry City Council	The mural was at The Three Tuns pub, Bull Yard, Coventry. In William Mitchell's distinctive 'Aztec' style. Was saved from demolition during August 2026 due to the City Centre South project.
