= List of commemorative plaques in Coventry =

This is a list of commemorative plaques (including blue plaques) in the city of Coventry, England.

Coventry is a city full of rich culture and history with notable figures and events. Typically, notable figures and landmarks which mark the heritage of the city will have a blue plaque nearby to the landmark or statues. Chairman of the Coventry Society, Keith Draper, said that, "All over the city, we have plaques of various shapes, sizes and colours that tell the story of prominent people and their achievements, and of important events". The list of plaques can be found below.

== Plaques ==
Subject	Notability	Location	Plaque Image	Year installed
In memory of the 45 Comrades that fell in World War I (1914–1918).	Created by the Coventry Chain Co, which paid tribute to the 45 comrades of theirs who lost their lives in the First World War.	Koco Community Resource Centre Building, Arches Industrial Estate, Spon End		1920, rededicated in 1999
Lady Godiva Clock.	A clock in Coventry shows puppets playing the story of Lady Godiva and how she rode across Coventry on a horse naked, and Peeping Tom, who disobeyed the order, stays behind closed doors. The Coventry Society recalls, "On the hour the bell strikes, the doors open and from the right-hand door comes a figure of Lady Godiva riding a white horse. She travels a short distance and goes through the other door out of sight. While this is happening, above is another window that also opens, and out pops the head of Peeping Tom. He has a quick look, then covers his eyes as it is said he was struck blind, and quickly pops his head back in. All the doors then close for another hour."	Hertford Street.		1953
The Phoenix by George Wagstaffe.	A Sculpture that highlights the rebuilding of Coventry and was unveiled by Princess Margaret. This sculpture symbolises the rebuilding of the city using the mythical Phoenix Bird creature, which rises out of the ashes of a fire.	Hertford Street.		1984
Philip Larkin CH CBE FRSL (1922–1985).	Larkin was a renowned poet and novelist born in Coventry. The plaque is engraved with the opening lines of his poem 'I Remember, I Remember'. The Independent says, "His poems evoke the widest range of moods, from the heartwarming celebration of The Whitsun Weddings to the bloody-minded zest of Toads; from the yearning of An Arundel Tomb to the despair of Aubade".	Coventry Railway Station Platform 1.		1998
John Hewitt (1907–1987)	Irish poet and Director of the Herbert Art Museum and Gallery from 1957–197.	Herbert Art Gallery and Museum, Jordan Well		1998
Coventry Watch Industry.	Coventry was one of the three main British centres of watch and clock manufacture in the industrial age. The Coventry Watchmakers Heritage Trail route includes 22 plaques at the sites of notable former watchmaking factories such as Rotherams, and important watchmakers homes.	Allesley Old Road, Craven Street, Lord Street, Lower Holyhead Road, Mount Street, Spon Street.		2000
History of Earlsdon	Millennium Heritage Trail celebrating sites significant to the development of Earlsdon, such as The Albany Social Club, The City Arms, The Imperial Cinema, The Old Nail Factory, and Weaver's Cottages.	Earlsdon.		2000
World War II (1939–1945) Home Front volunteers	Commemorating the over 1.5 million volunteers who joined the Home Guard, with more than 80,000 women part of the Women's Land Army.	Old Cathedral, St Michaels Avenue.		2000
The Lychgate Cottages (built c. 1414–1415)	The last surviving building inside the former enclosed forecourt of St. Mary's Cathedral.	Priory Row.		2001
Lady Herbert's Garden and the Garden of International Friendship	The garden of International Friendship was opened in 2000 as part of the City Council's Millennium Scheme: Phoenix Initiative.	Lady Herbert's Garden, Hales Street.		2004
Sir Frank Whittle, OM, KBE, CB, FRS (1907–1996).	Whittle was a Royal Air Force officer from Coventry who made a major contribution to the invention of the jet engine. He flew kites as a child on the Common.	Hearsall Common.		Date unknown
Sir Frank Whittle, OM, KBE, CB, FRS (1907–1996).	As above. Commemorating the centenary of his birth.	Under the Whittle Arch in Millennium Place, outside the Coventry Transport Museum.		2007
Highfield Road Stadium.	This was the home of Coventry City Football Club from 1899 to 2005. Coventry Live reminisces fondly on how "Highfield Road was in the heart of one of Coventry’s communities and you could basically see into people’s homes between the stands, which added to the feel that the club was part of the city itself."	Signet Square.		2008
The Hand and Heart.	This was a public house that was known to house a number of major musical bands, the Coventry band The Specials were one of the artists. Reggae band Hardtop 22 played there – a few months later key members of the band would form the core of the Selecter. On February 23, 1978, a band called the Coventry Automatics played the venue; on Friday, December 1, 1978, they returned as the Specials.	Far Gosford Street.		2009
Dame Ellen Terry (1847–1928).	Women's History Network highlights how Terry was "A prominent Shakespearean actress born in Coventry. She is one of the most respected performers of the era and achieved international success".	Upper Precinct.		2015
Siegfried Bettmann (1863–1951).	Coventry Live write how, "he was president of the Coventry Liberal Association, a freemason, a founder member and president of Coventry’s Chamber of Commerce, a Justice of the Peace, and chairman of the Standard Motor Company, and in 1913 he became Mayor of Coventry - the first non-British subject ever to do so"	Stoke Park.		2015
Delia Derbyshire (1937–2001).	She is best known for carrying out pioneering work with the BBC Radiophonic Workshop during the 1960s, including the theme music to the British series Doctor Who.. Derbyshire was also awarded an Honorary Doctorate of Arts at Coventry University.	Coventry University.	2015 (( Siegfired Bettmann (1863 - ) Triumph cycle and motorcycles fame, the plaque is on his house Elm Bank 9 North Avenue Coventry A Coventry Society plaque unveiled in September 2015.	2017
St Mary's Hall.	This landmark is located in the city's historic Cathedral Quarter, the magnificent medieval interiors and fine artworks offer a window into Coventry's glorious past. Mary, Queen of Scots, and Shakespeare are some of the few notable figures who have visited this historic landmark.	Bayley Lane.		2017
Ira Aldridge (1807–1867)	Britain's first black Shakespearean actor who became manager of the Coventry Theatre in 1828.	Lower Precinct.		2017
The Italian Job film location.	Filming location for the Mini car chase through sewers in the film The Italian Job, released in 1969.	Stoke Aldermoor.		2019
Philip Larkin CH CBE FRSL (1922–1985).	As above.	Poultney Road, his birthplace.		2022
Eileen Sheridan (1923–2023)	Pioneering cyclist who raced with the with Coventry Cycling Club. She broke all the records of the Women's Road Records Association during the late 1940s and 1950s.	Butts Park Arena, formerly the site of Coventry velodrome.	Blue Plaque commemorating Eileen Sheridan's first race win	2024
The ruined cathedral church of St Michael.	This was one of the largest parish churches in England at the time, built for the Earl's half of Coventry. This is one of the defining monuments for Coventry which dominates the city centre. Atlas Obscura writes how; "The original St Michaels Cathedral in Coventry was built between the late 14th century and early 15th century. It now stands ruined, bombed almost to destruction during the massive attack on the city by German bombers on the night of November 14th, 1940. After the war, the cathedral was not rebuilt on site but left in ruins as a testament to the futility of war."	St Michaels Avenue.		
One of the few surviving three-storied jettied buildings of Coventry.	The Plaque highlights one of the few buildings left in Coventry, which was bombed during the Blitz where Coventry was known to be heavily affected by it.	Spon Street.		
The Council House.	The red sandstone facing and early Tudor styling was chosen by a competition to be in keeping with nearby St Mary's Hall. The large porch is flanked by gilded armorial decoration under giant figures of Leofric and Godiva.	Earl Street.		
