= Criterion Theatre (Coventry) =

Coordinates: 52.398149°N 1.529881°W

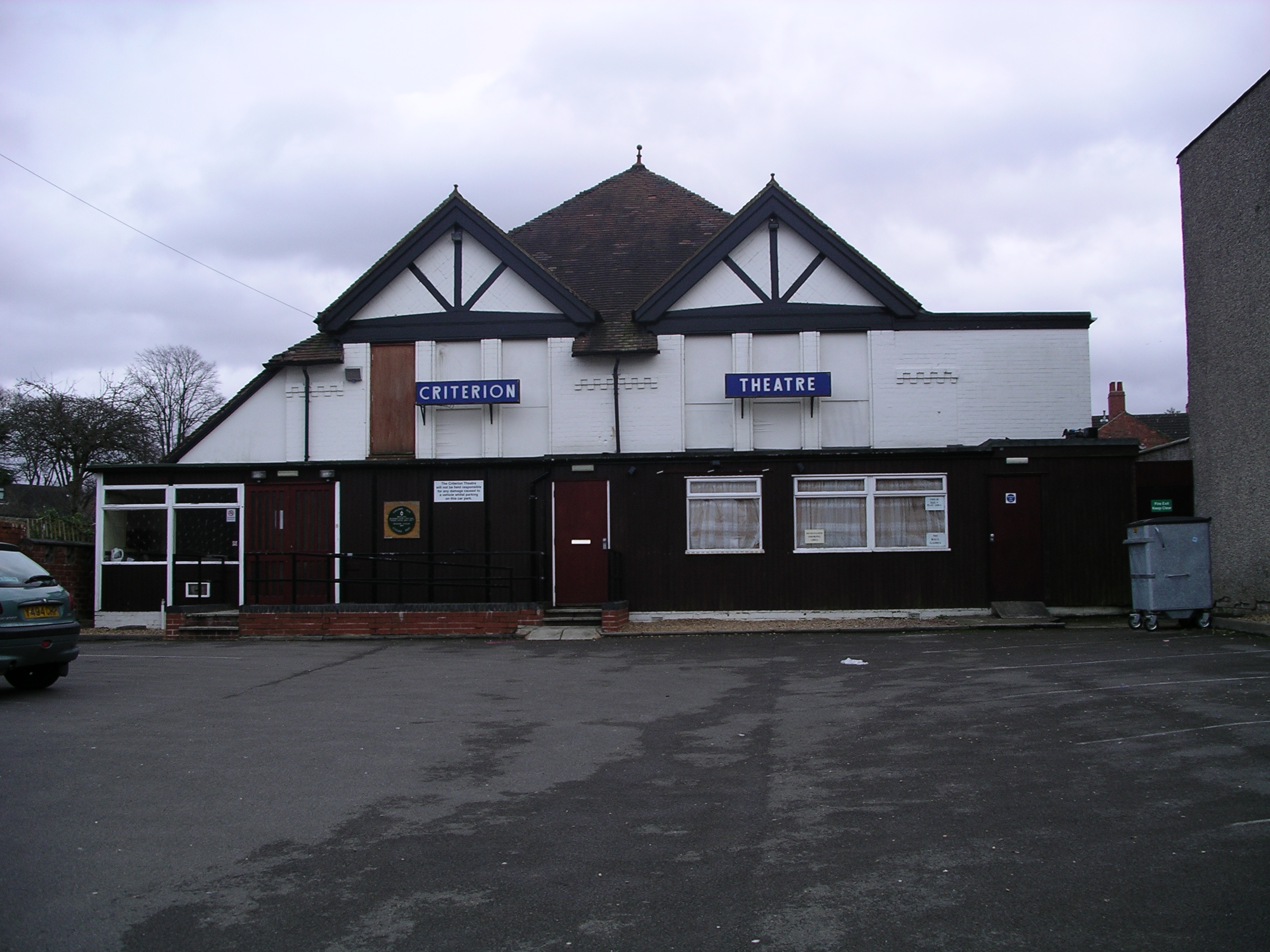
- Interactive map of Criterion Theatre
- Address: Berkeley Road South; Earlsdon; Coventry; West Midlands; England
- Owner: Criterion Players

Construction
- Opened: 1961

Website
- www.criteriontheatre.co.uk

The Criterion Theatre is situated in Earlsdon, Coventry, England. It puts on about seven shows a year. The company has won the Godiva Award for best theatre in the region several times. The current patrons are Pete Waterman, music producer and railway preservationist, born in Coventry and Ron Cook, stage and screen actor of Thunderbirds and Doctor Who fame, who first acted as an amateur at the Criterion. The Coventry born actor, Sir Nigel Hawthorne (1929–2001), was a former patron.

== Theatre building ==
The building was constructed in the 1880s and originally served as the Earlsdon Methodist Church. It remained in use as the main church until 1923, when a new Methodist church was opened on the corner of Albany Road and Earlsdon Avenue South. After this, the original building became a Sunday school and a venue for a wide range of community activities.

In 1960, the Methodist Church sold the property to the Criterion Players, a local amateur dramatic society founded in 1955. The group converted the building into a theatre with a single stage, and the Criterion Theatre officially opened in 1961 by Mr S. H. Newshome, a patron of the society and the managing director of the since‑demolished Coventry Hippodrome.
