= Hearsall Common =

Park in Coventry, England

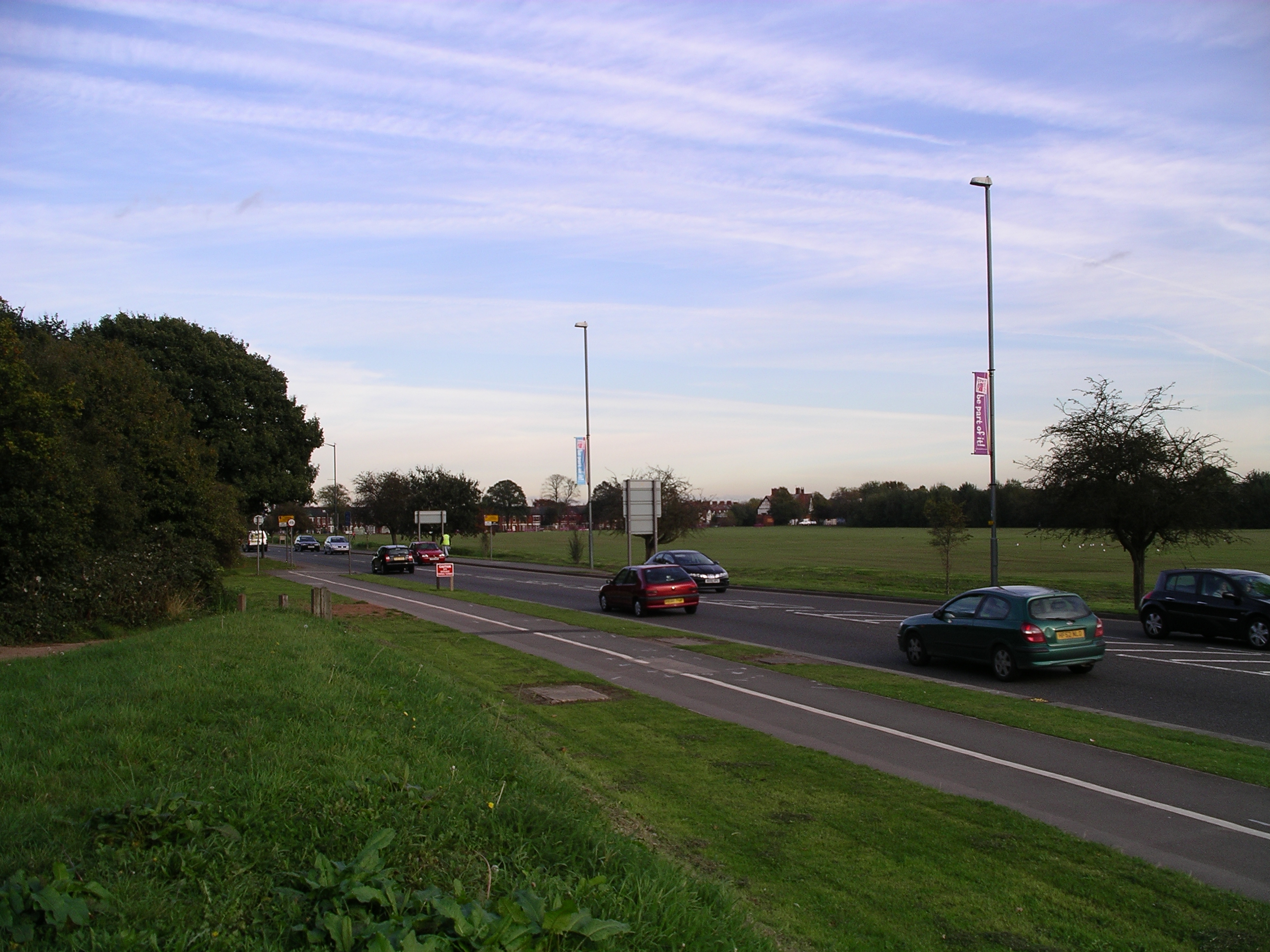
- View to the east
- Interactive map of Hearsall Common
- Type: Public open space
- Location: Earlsdon, Coventry, England.
- Coordinates: 52.403677°N 1.537667°W
- Created: Common land from at least the fifteenth century, and reassigned as recreation ground in 1927
- Operator: Coventry City Council
- Status: Open all year

Hearsall Common /ˈhɜːrsəl/ is located in Earlsdon, Coventry in the West Midlands, central England.

The common consists of a large grassy area with a smaller partly tarmacadamed area on one side of Hearsall Common Road, and a wooded nature reserve on the other side. It is free to enter and open to the public as of right, 24 hrs a day; however, after several years of residents complaining about itinerant or nomadic travellers using the common, an embankment was built alongside the roads to prevent vehicles from driving onto the common. The common has for a long time been host to circus and fairs. Previously it hosted the 'crock fair'.

Hearsall Common has a long history of being common land going back to at least the thirteenth century. It was reassigned as recreation ground by a Coventry Corporation Act of 1927, along with other areas of common land in Coventry.

== History ==
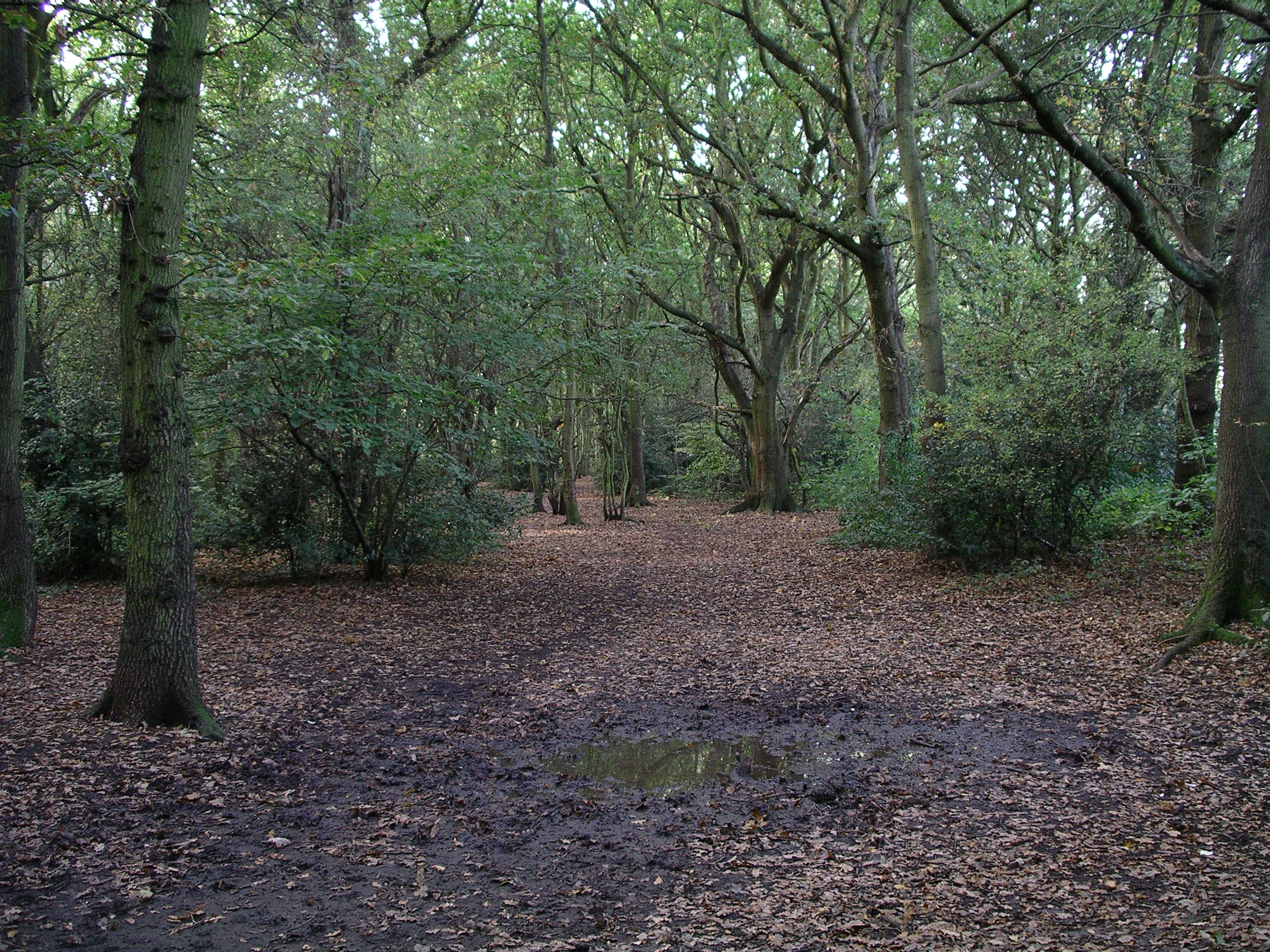
Wooded area in the nature reserve

The first detailed survey of the common land and waste ground in and around Coventry was made in 1423. These areas have been important for centuries as common land for grazing animals. In the 18th century, when Coventry was much smaller than it is now, the eastern areas of Hearsall Common fell within Coventry's boundaries, while the western areas extended far beyond them. Hearsall Common, together with Coventry's other commons, Sowe, Whitley, Barras Heath and Radford, surrounded the city and constricted its growth. The city was the third or fourth most important city in the country during the medieval period, behind London, York and, arguably, Norwich, but the jealously guarded Freeman's rights to graze animals on the commons prevented the city from expanding into these areas and growing. This tight constraint on growth is thought to be the reason why Birmingham, which was just a village until the 17th century, became the large metropolis that is now with a population three times greater than that of Coventry.

The Coventry Corporation Act of 1927 reassigned Whitley Common, Hearsall Common, Barras Heath, and Radford Common as recreation grounds, and ended all the remaining traditional commoning rights on waste ground in Coventry, and the "freemen" of the city, who had been allowed to have up to three animals grazing on these areas since 1833, received an annual sum of £100 as compensation.

Twenty one acres of the common had been developed as sports pitches by 1954.

== Uses ==
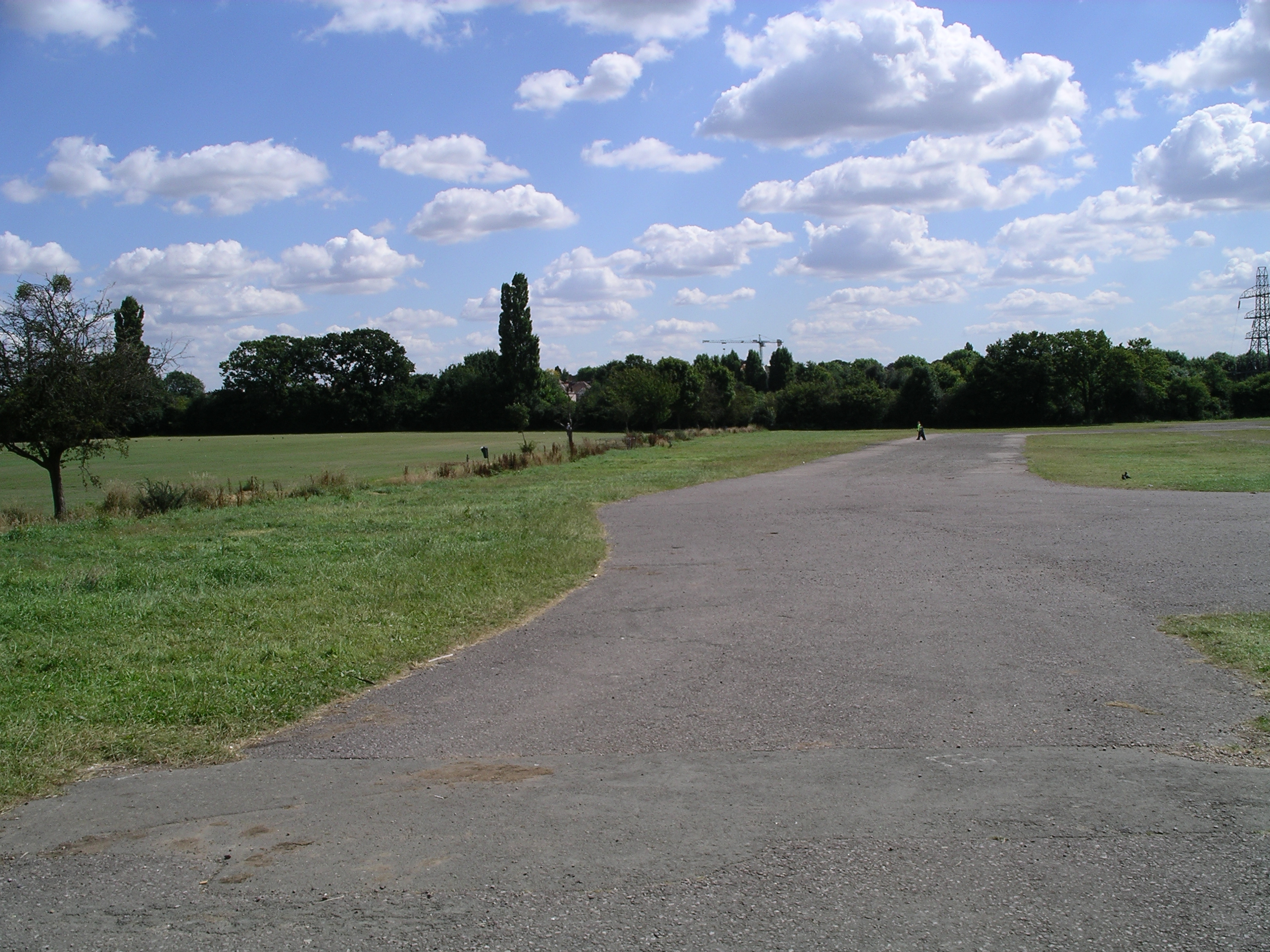
Hearsall Common (partly tarmacked area on the right and area of cut grass on the left)

The section of Hearsall Common which is partly covered with rough grass and partly covered with tarmac or gravel is used by fairs or circuses and their associated heavy vehicles. The Moscow State Circus, which gave performances for five days in November 2004, is one of many circuses that have visited the common over the years.

The larger eastern section of the common is a large open area of mowed grass that attracts dog walkers, sunbathers, kite flyers. and local children to play football. On the north side of the road near to the woods there is a cycle speedway track that is used by Coventry Cycle Speedway Club for competitions.

At one point, the Earlsdon Festival moved temporarily from being based predominantly in Earlsdon Street to the common. The festival usually takes place on the May Day bank holiday weekend.

After a lot of rain in the summer of 2007, the Donkey Derby which was scheduled to take place in the War Memorial Park, Coventry was held at Hearsall Common.

== Frank Whittle ==
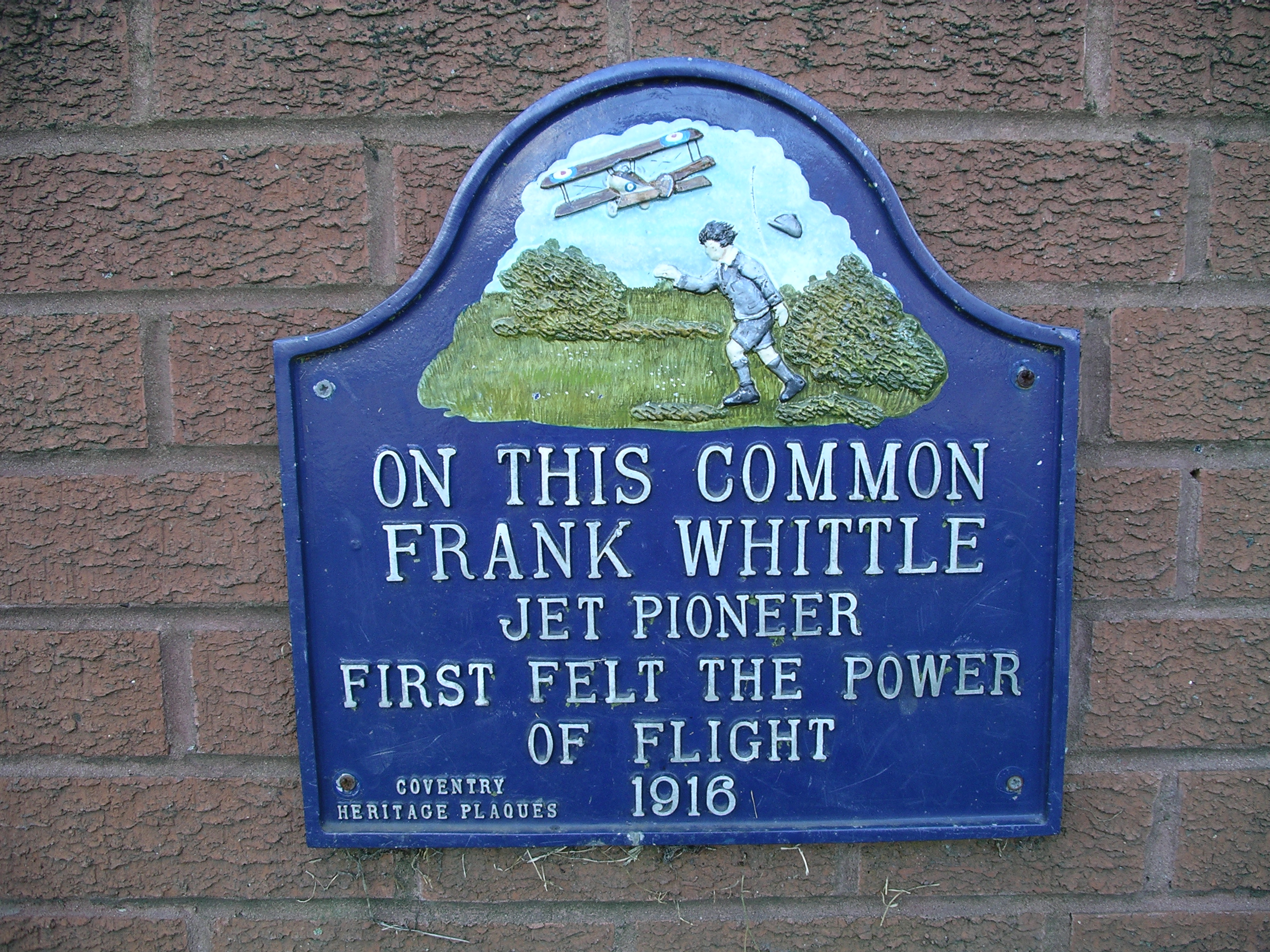
The plaque (close up)

Frank Whittle, the aerospace engineer and jet pioneer, was born in Earlsdon, and the house in Newcombe Road that he grew up in, which has a commemorative plaque on it, is about half a mile from the common. He was apparently inspired to pursue a career in engineering after seeing an aircraft land on Hearsall Common in 1916, from which grew the urban myth that the aircraft blew his hat off and this in particular inspired him, as a young boy, to become involved in aeronautics. A plaque on the common alludes to this story.

== Gallery ==
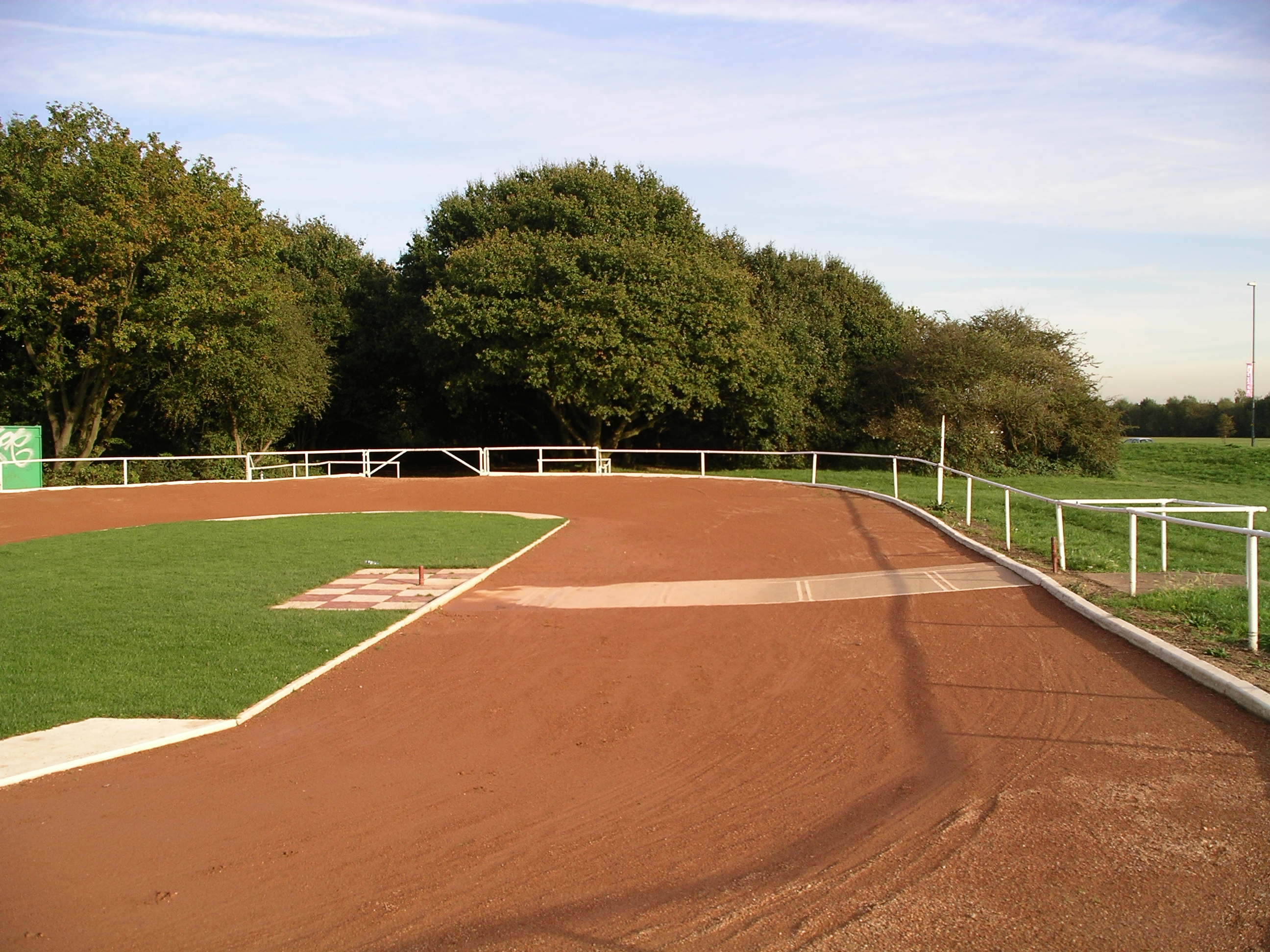
The cycle speedway track

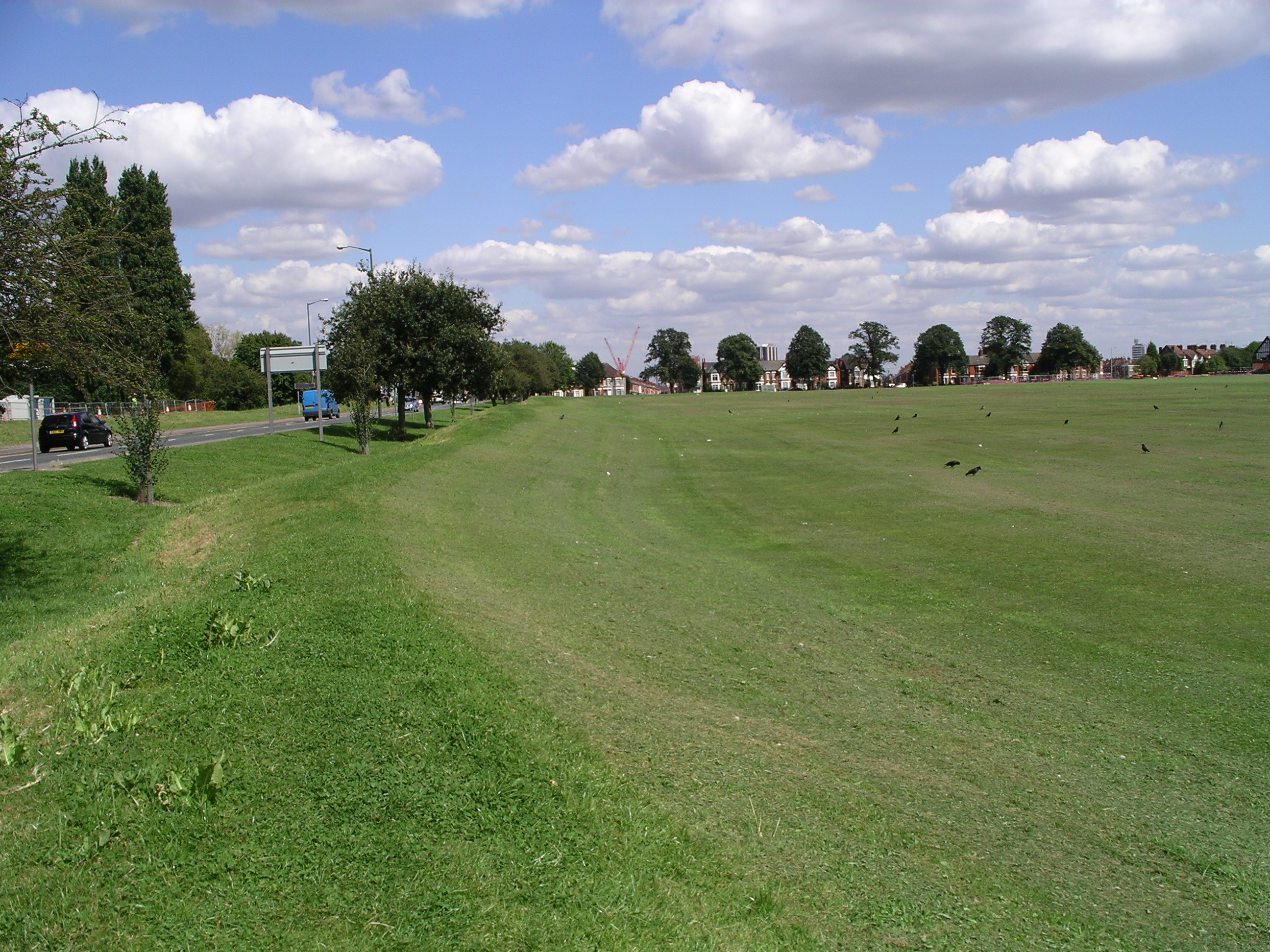
Hearsall Common (view to the east)

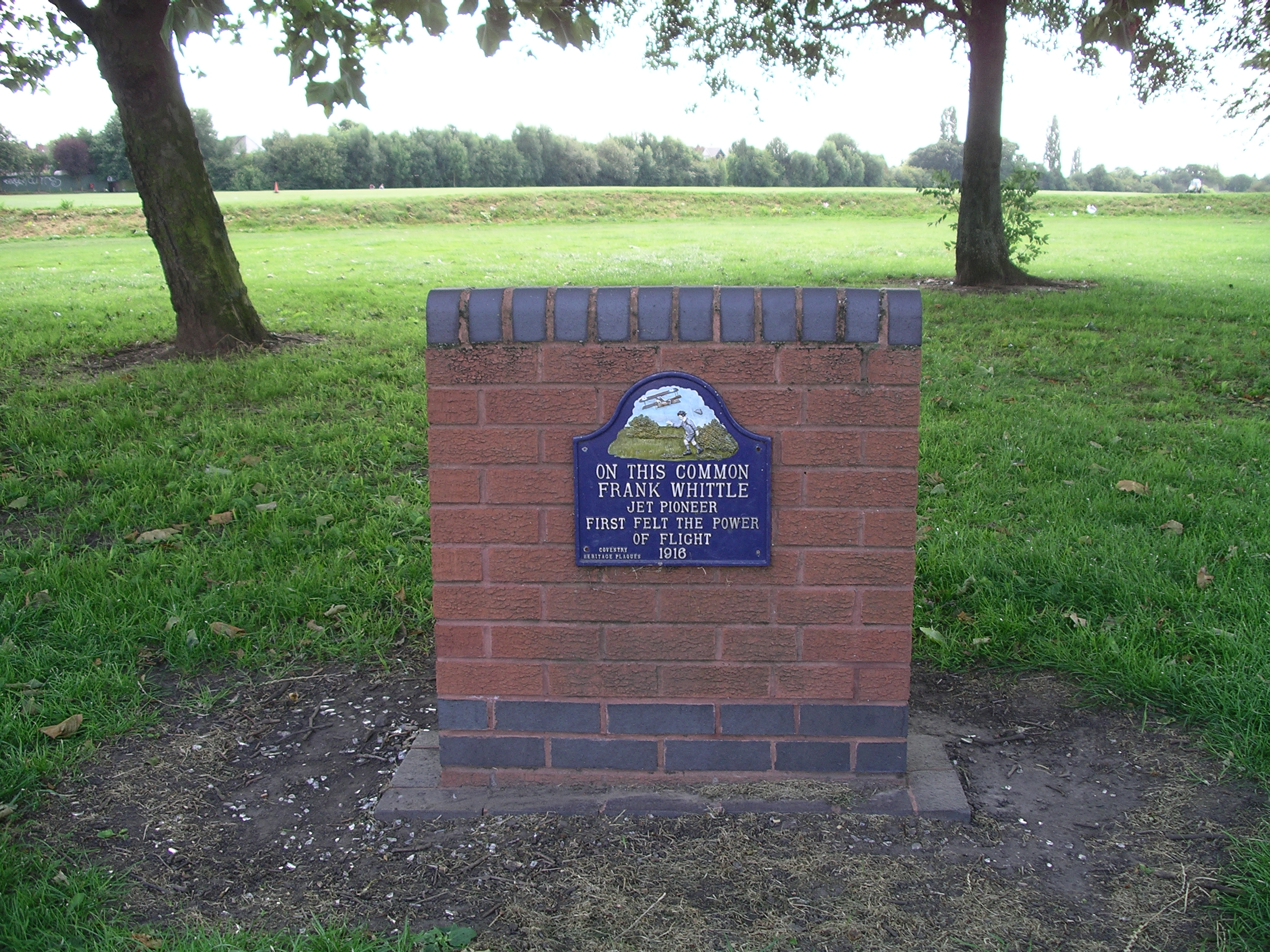
The plaque commemorating Frank Whittle's inspiration

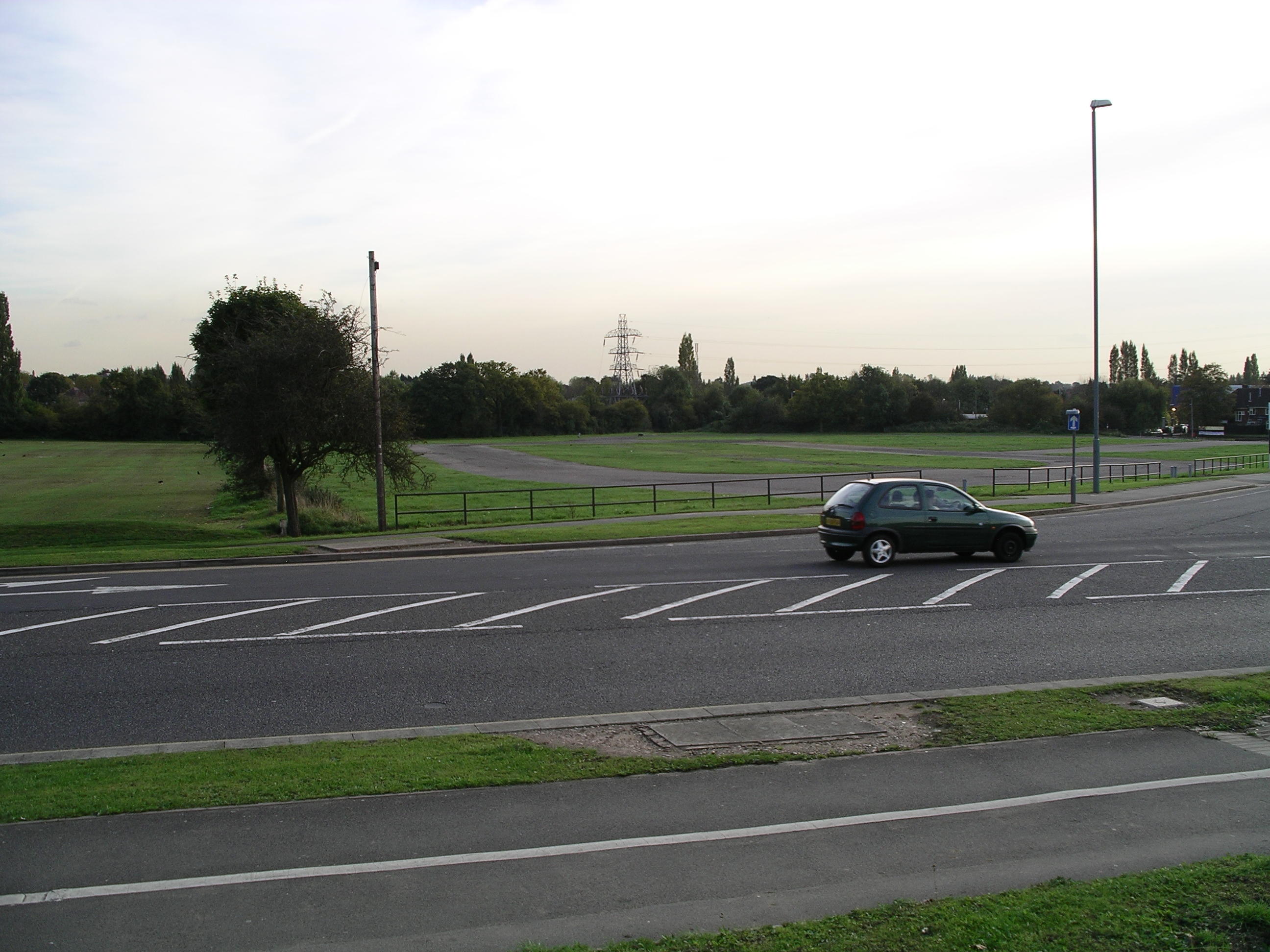
Hearsall Common (partly tarmacked area on the other side of the road)
