= Coventry Cross =

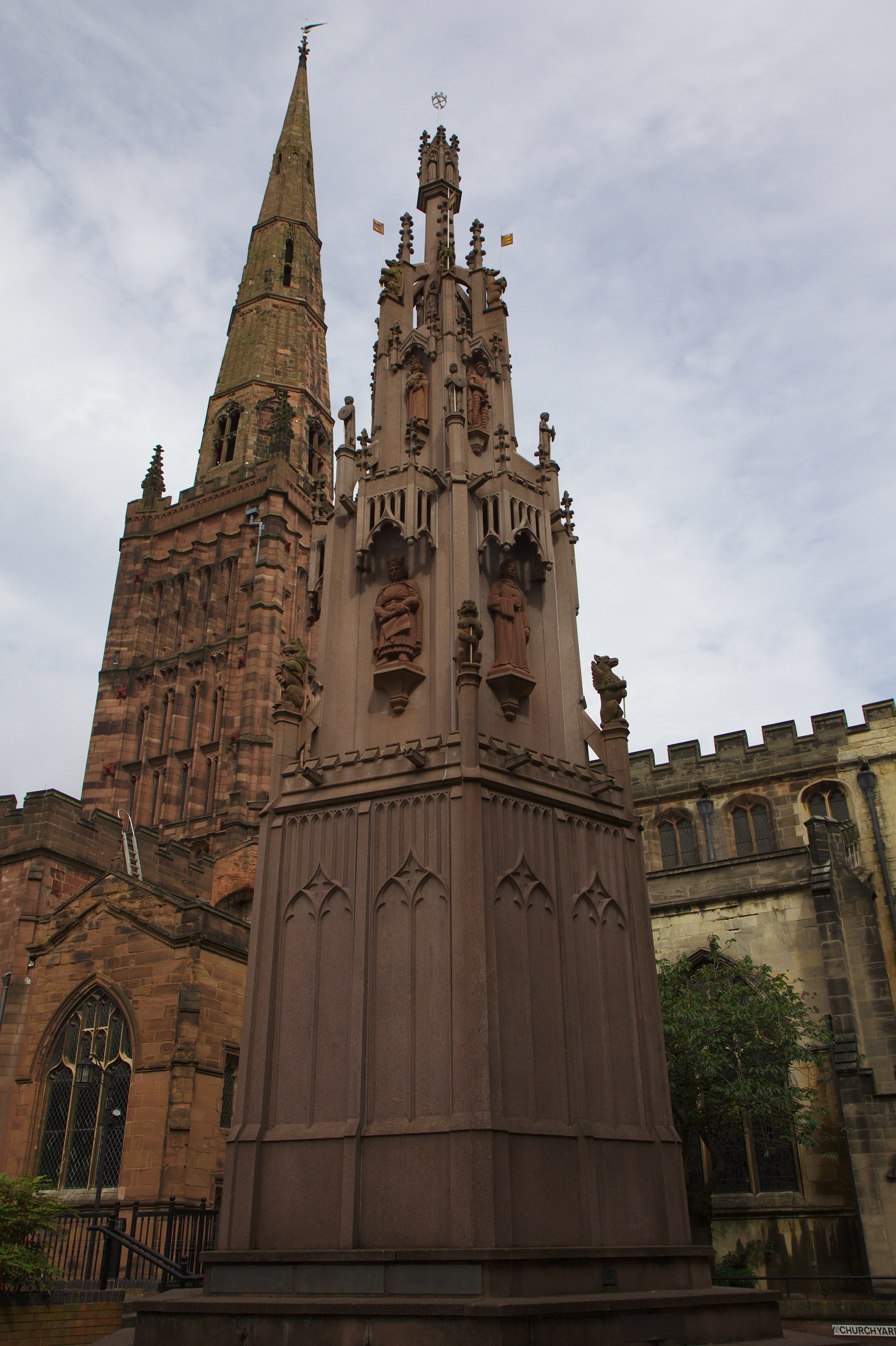
- The replica of the cross was erected in 1976.
- Interactive map of Coventry Cross
- Location: Coventry
- Coordinates: 52.40822°N 1.50858°W
- Type: Market Cross
- Beginning date: c.1300, 1423, 1544, 1976

Coventry Cross was an important landmark in the cathedral city of Coventry, England. Standing between Cuckoo Lane and Holy Trinity Church and in the alley known as Trinity Churchyard, it was a modern version of the historic market cross, such as was common in many medieval market towns.

== History ==
=== Early Medieval Cross ===
From medieval times, a cross stood at the southern end of Cross Cheaping, where it met Broadgate, about 100 metres from where the new one stands. This was the market place, and place of executions, and the earliest reference to a cross here is in a document dated 1300. This cross would probably have been carved from local red sandstone in the shape of a tall shaft topped with a simple cross, as was the style in the rest of the city and surrounding area.

=== Fifteenth-century Cross ===
On 24 May 1423 the court-leet ordered that a new cross be made and on the Thursday after Saint Matthias day in 1423 the mayor, Henry Peyto, held a meeting in St Mary's hall which officially sanctioned the building of a cross in Cross Cheaping. The Leet contributed £50 and the mayor also made a personal contribution to pay for it. The City Annals describe this cross as standing on eight pillars, and it stood for over a hundred years before it became unsafe and part of the upper section had to be taken down in 1537.

=== Tudor Cross ===
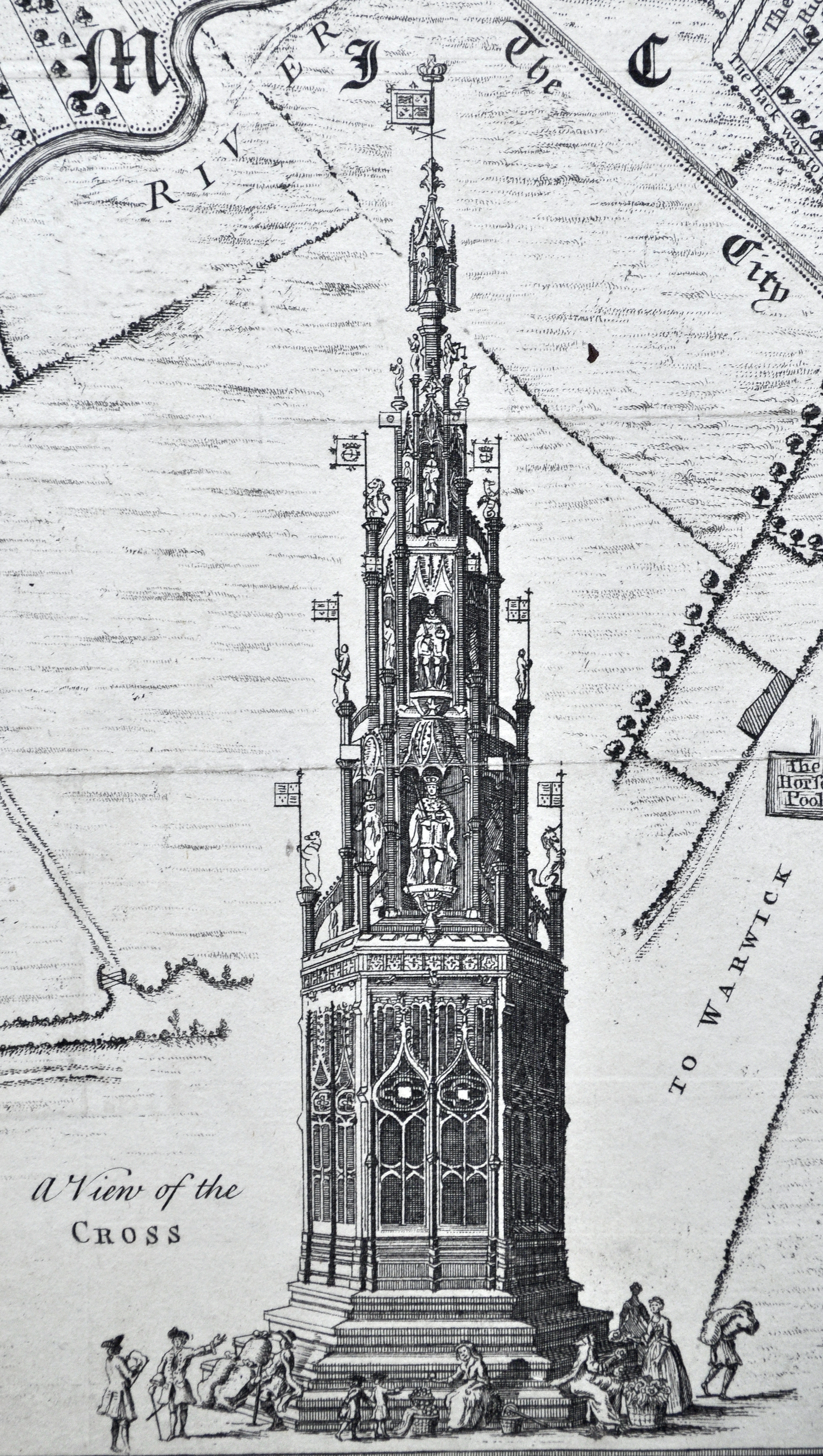
Tudor Coventry Cross as shown on Bradford's Map 1748/9

By 1506 discussions had already begun about replacing it, and a fund started. In 1541, a former mayor of London, Sir William Hollyes, who had been born in Stoke, Coventry, left £200 in his will for a new cross, and building started the same year.

An indenture details how the cross was to be made, based on one in Abingdon, Berkshire, and made of ‘seasonable free-stone of the quarries of Attleborough and Rowington’. It was to be built on the same spot as the old cross and on every pinnacle of the lower storey have ‘a beast or fowl holding up a fan’. On each pinnacle of the second storey there was to be ‘the image of a naked boy with a target and holding up a fan’. The cross was 57 feet high, in four sections, with statues in the top three storeys: the lower of these holding statues of Henry VI, King John, Edward I, Henry II, Richard I and Henry. Above these were Edward III, Henry II, Richard III, St Michael and St George. The top storey held statues of St Peter, St James, St Christopher and two monks, with representations of Liberty and Justice at the highest point. Several of these statues were said to have been taken from Whitefriars and set in the cross. The new Coventry Cross was completed in 1544. It was brightly painted, and covered with gold. The city treasurer's accounts of 1545 include the entry "To Matthew Gilder for gildyng the crosse £8 6s. 8p." The nearby Golden Cross public house, erected some 40 years later at 8 Hay Lane, was probably named after it, as well as the 16th-century Coventry Cross public house at 29 Cross Cheaping.

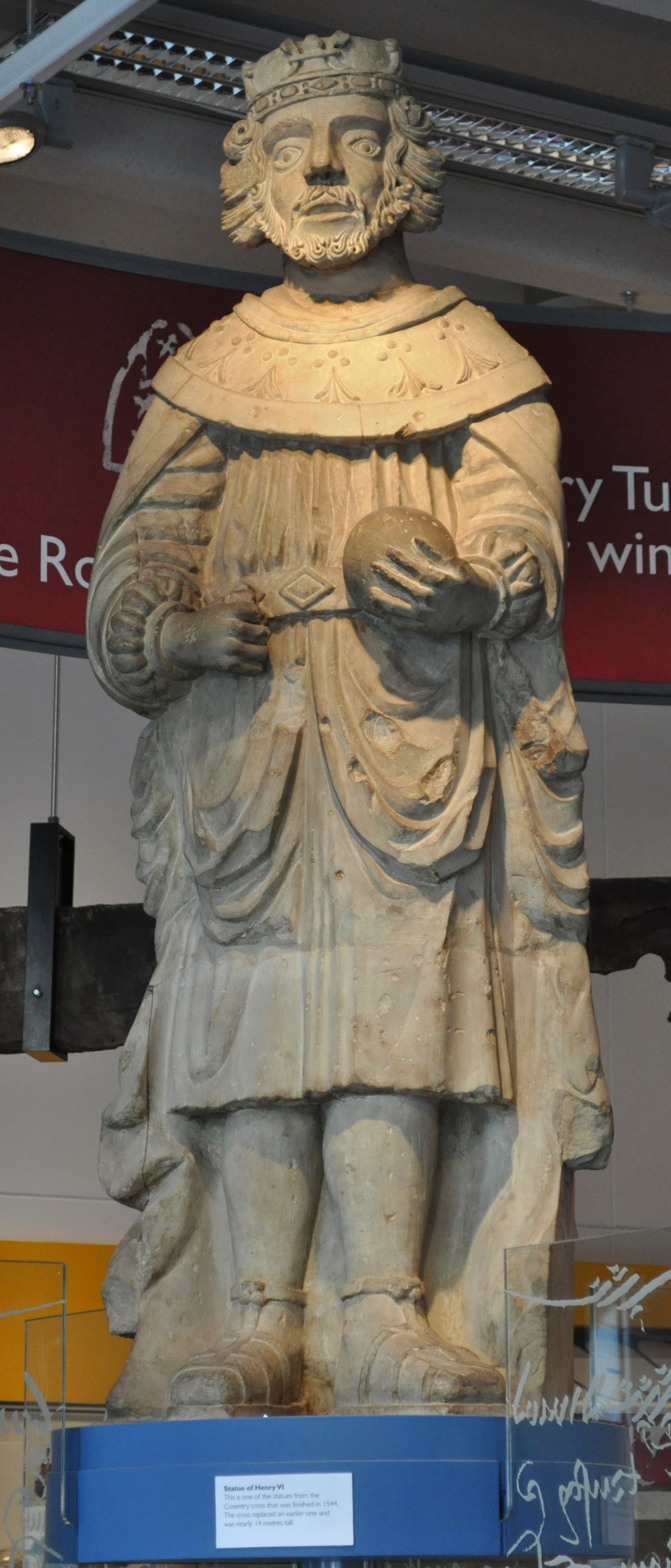
The statue of Henry VI as it stands in the Herbert Art Gallery and Museum.

The City carried out repairs to the cross in 1608–9, and replaced a figure of Jesus with one of Lady Godiva.

During the Commonwealth, as a result of puritan objections, six sets of royal coats of arms were removed from the cross in December 1650. According to the diary entry of John Evelyn on 3 August 1654, the cross was still in good condition. In 1688 major restoration work included re-gilding of most of the cross, and it was said at the time that on a sunny day people could hardly bear to look directly at it.

The 1544 cross stood for two centuries, but then decay was once more setting in. A map drawn by Samuel Bradford in 1748/9 shows the cross in detail. But in 1753 and 1755 the top two stages were removed to avoid danger of collapse.

In 1771 Coventry Council authorised the demolition of the cross, though some remains were still there after 1778 when a visitor to Coventry wrote that the decayed cross "...has no longer anything to please". The cross was then totally removed and its parts reused. Three of the statues still survive: two are currently in St Mary's Guildhall, while a statue of Henry VI is in the Herbert Art Gallery and Museum. Some of the stone from the demolished cross was rumoured to have been used to rebuild Spon Bridge over the River Sherbourne in Spon End.

==== Henry VI ====
Henry VI was a figure of particular importance in the Coventry area. A Lancastrian king, he was put to death in the Tower. A cult of veneration then grew to 'Henry the Martyr', and despite early attempts to ban it (in 1479 the Archbishop of York banned veneration of his image), it continued to grow, encouraged by Henry VII. In 1494 Pope Alexander VI set up a commission of enquiry to look into miracles attributed to him and by 1499 his cult was even bigger than that of Thomas Becket. It was particularly strong in Coventry which supported the House of Lancaster during the Wars of the Roses, and which in 1456 was home to Queen Margaret, wife of Henry VI, who moved the court there as London grew increasingly Yorkist in sympathy. The veneration of Henry VI only came to an end with the Dissolution of the Monasteries.

=== 20th/21st century ===
In the 1930s it was proposed to build a replica of the 1544 cross, but work did not begin until the 1960s. The modern cross — made by sculptor George Wagstaffe — was finally unveiled in 1976, 100 metres from the original position. Based on its medieval precursor, it has four tiers and is surrounded by a flight of four steps.

In 2007 the city council considered relocating the cross to form the centrepiece of a new public square at Ironmonger Row and the Burges, but a public consultation indicated that it should not be moved. In 2018 the council wanted to have it taken down, but the people of Coventry started a petition to stop this. This failed, and by January 2019 the cross had been removed.

In 2023, the cross was reinstated in a more prominent location, close to the proposed 2007 relocation.

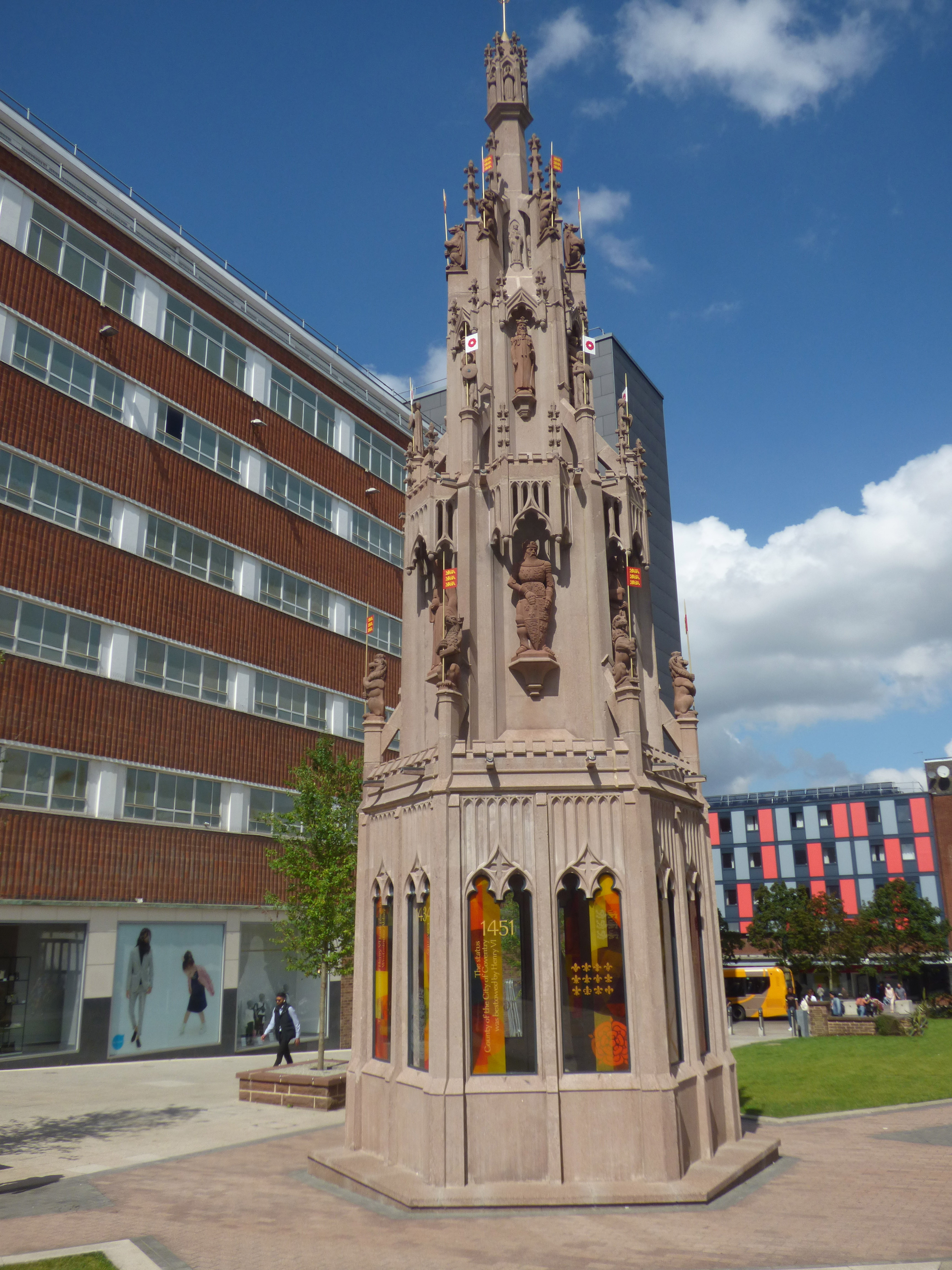
The new Coventry Cross at Broadgate on what was Trinity Street from 2023.

== See also ==
- Banbury Cross
