= William Chattaway =

English sculptor and draughtsman (1927–2019)

- Born: 1927; Coventry
- Died: 2019, 2019 (aged 91–92)
- Alma mater: Coventry School of Art and Design; Slade School of Fine Art
- Occupation: Sculptor

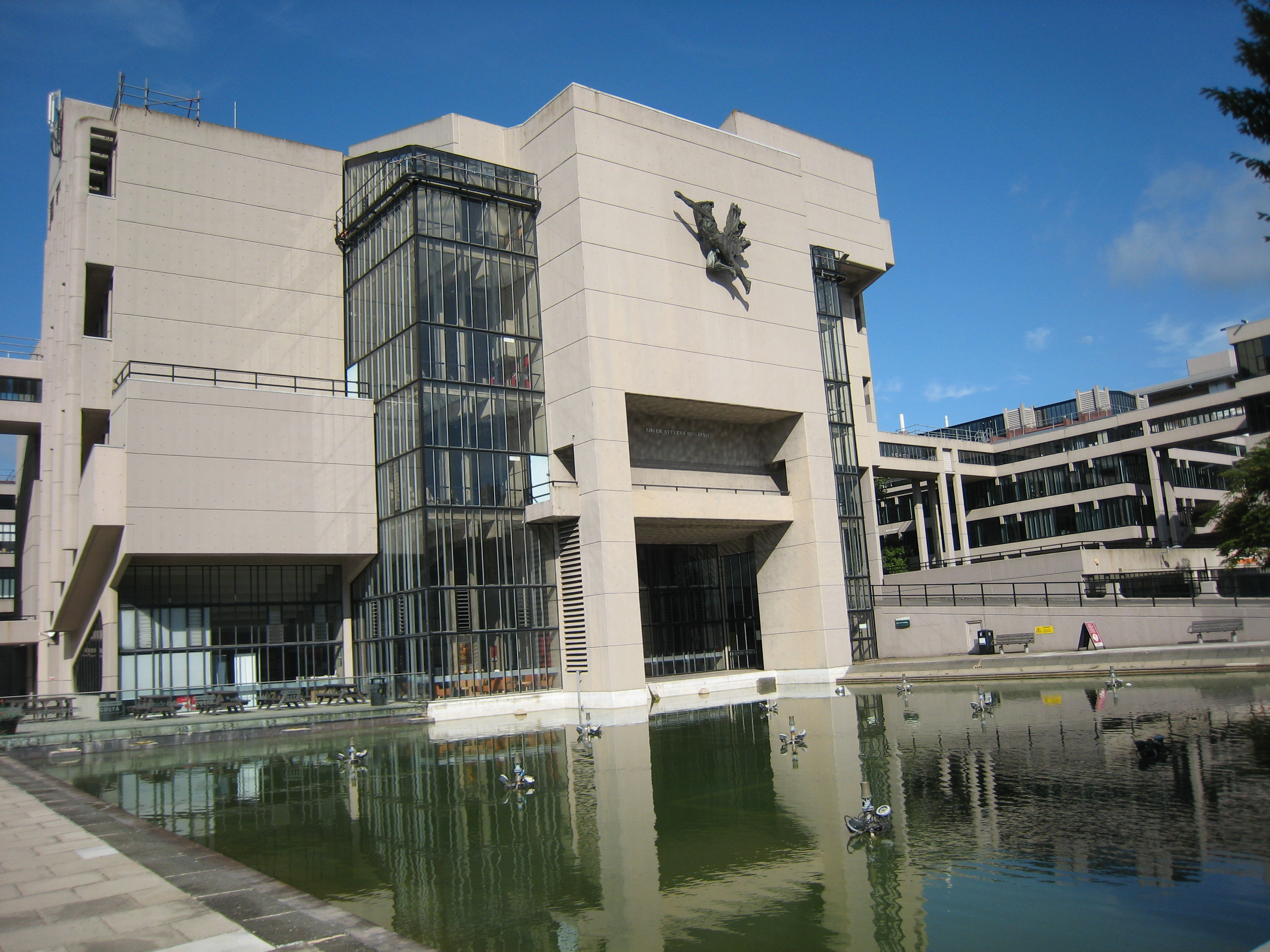
Hermes, on the Roger Stevens Building, University of Leeds

William Chattaway (1927–2019) was an English sculptor and draughtsman known for his artwork and sculptures which have been exhibited extensively in France, the UK and the United States. He emigrated to Paris in 1950, where he permanently settled and continued his career. He is regarded for his contributions to British Postwar and Contemporary art. Some of his famous works include The Spirit of Enterprise/Hermes on display in the Leeds University Library and Female Head at the Herbert Art Gallery & Museum in Coventry.

== Life and career ==
Chattaway was born and raised in Coventry, where he attended the Coventry School of Art and Design from 1943 to 1945. He pursued his further studies in London at the Slade School of Fine Art from 1945 to 1948. He left England for Paris in 1950, where he settled and lived till his death in 2019.

Chattaway was heavily influenced by Swiss sculptor and painter Alberto Giacometti's Walking Man and his experiments with human figure during the 1950s and 60s. Inspired by Giacometti's work, Chattaway experimented with the female form in his sculptures, as he considered spatial relationships and the concept of movement within a single, life-size work. Many of his works like Seated Female Nude (1972), Femme nue assise (1968) and Femme nue debout (1968) were created with this vision in mind.

He regularly collaborated with the Herbert Art Gallery & Museum in Coventry, starting with an exhibition of his work in 1969. In 2012, Chattaway donated 2 new sculptures to the Herbert, as a tribute to his city of birth. The sculptures were put on display at the Jordan Well avenue.
