= William of Coventry =

English Carmelite friar and historian (fl. c. 1340–1360)

William of Coventry (called Claudius Conversus; fl. c. 1340–1360) was an English Carmelite friar and historian. He wrote on the history of Carmelites and other subjects.

== Works ==
William was born at Coventry, and became a Carmelite. He must have been a lay brother of the order there, since if he was lame, as the name Claudius indicates, he could not have been ordained. Bale possessed copies of works by him on the history of the Carmelites. Three of Coventry's historical works, written either c. 1340 or c. 1360, survive in the form of fifteenth- and sixteenth-century transcripts. Bale ascribes to him also an Elucidarium Fidei, which occurs in many manuscripts, and has been printed as the work of Anselm. It has also been ascribed to Honorius of Autun, Guibert Novigentinus, and even Augustine. Bale ascribes to William Carmina Diversa.

== See also ==
- Whitefriars, Coventry

== Sources ==
- Jotischky, Andrew (2004). "Coventry, William [called Claudius Conversus] (fl. c. 1340/1360), Carmelite friar and historian". Oxford Dictionary of National Biography (online ed.). Oxford University Press. doi:10.1093/ref:odnb/29485. (Subscription or UK public library membership required.)

Attribution:

- This article incorporates text from a publication now in the public domain: Bateson, Mary (1900). "William of Coventry". In Lee, Sidney (ed.). Dictionary of National Biography. Vol. 61. London: Smith, Elder & Co. pp. 377–378.
