= Earlsdon =

Suburb of Coventry, England

Coordinates: 52.40°N 1.53°W

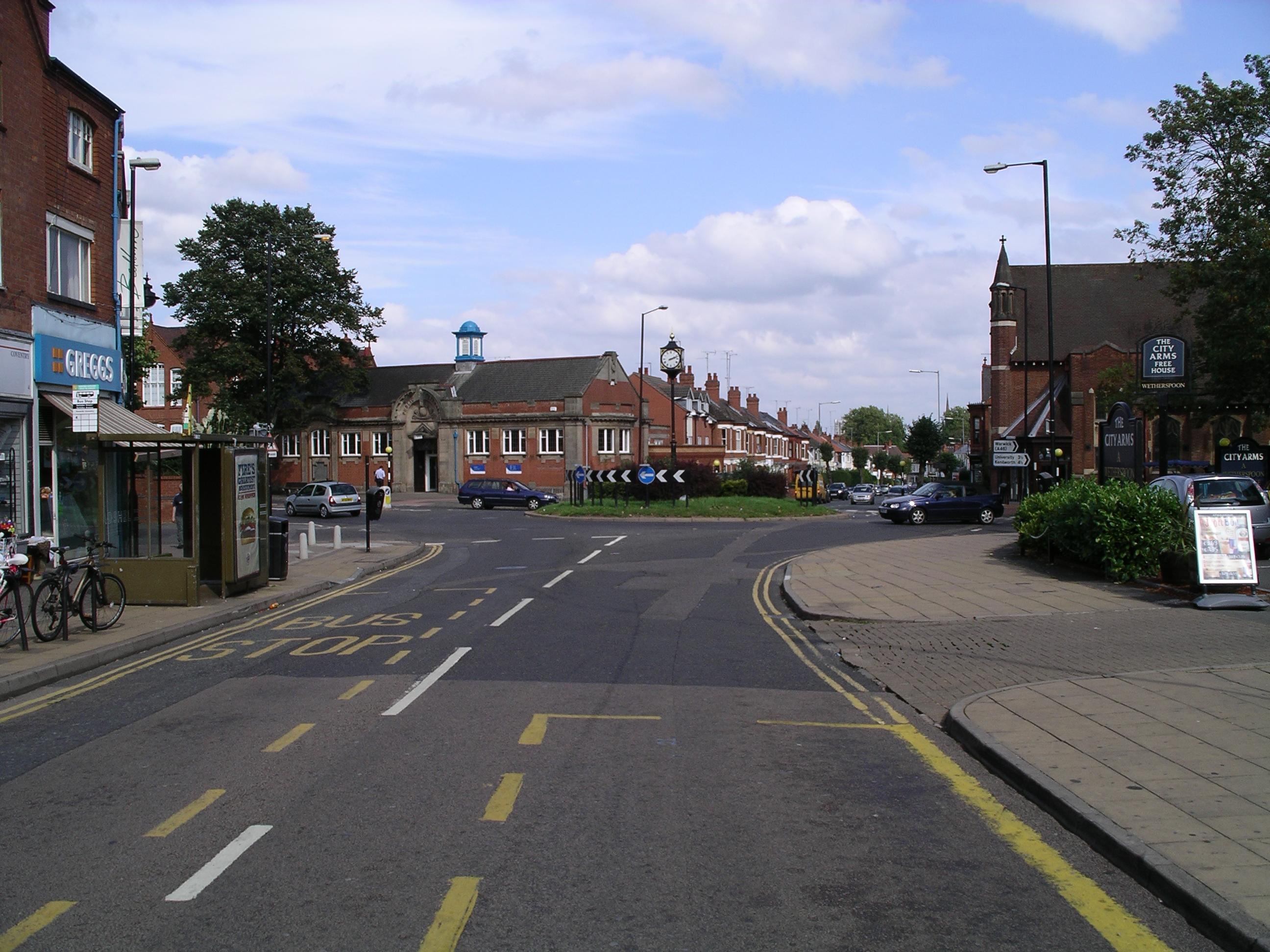
- Earlsdon Library
- Area: 2.02 sq mi (5.2 km^{2})
- Population: 15,458
  - Density: 7,652/sq mi (2,954/km^{2})
- OS grid reference: SP320780
  - London: 106 miles (171 km)
- Metropolitan borough: Coventry
- Metropolitan county: West Midlands
- Region: West Midlands
- Country: England
- Sovereign state: United Kingdom
- Post town: COVENTRY
- Postcode district: CV5
- Dialling code: 024
- Police: West Midlands
- Fire: West Midlands
- Ambulance: West Midlands
- UK Parliament: Coventry South

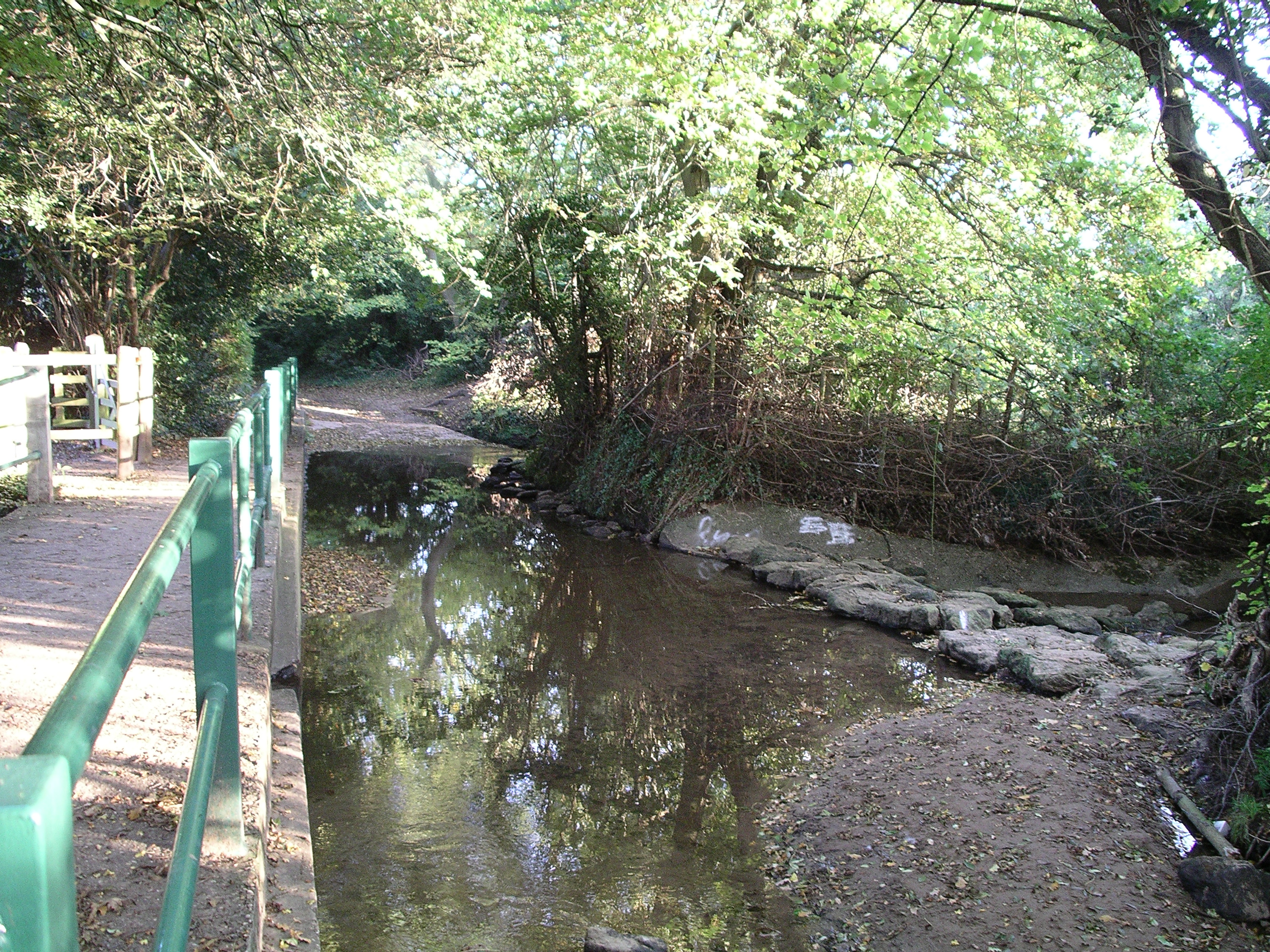
Canley Ford, Earlsdon

Earlsdon is a residential suburb and electoral ward of Coventry, England. It lies approximately one mile to the southwest of Coventry City Centre. It is the birthplace of aviation pioneer Frank Whittle.

== Amenities ==
Most shops and restaurants are laid out on Earlsdon Street, the suburban high street. Earlsdon Library is one of the largest of the local-authority libraries outside of the city centre.

In major sports, Earlsdon has its own rugby, golf and tennis clubs. Recreation grounds for football also are in Earlsdon.

== History ==
In the mid-19th century, Earlsdon was a hub of activity for the rising watch-making trade. Even as the industry began to decline, Earlsdon continued to grow and was incorporated into the city of Coventry in 1890. The watch-making trade is represented by the clock on the roundabout at the bottom of the high street, where Earlsdon Avenue North and South join.

In 1897, the opening of Albany Road, named after Princess Helena, Duchess of Albany, who visited Coventry in November the following year, allowed for far greater access to and from the rest of the city and development in Earlsdon quickly increased. By 1918, the area was fully developed as it is today, but has seen some redevelopment in recent years.

Today, Earlsdon is a large residential suburb associated with Wainbody ward to the south. Many academics and students from Coventry University and the University of Warwick live in both wards as they are closest to Coventry University and have streets of upmarket Edwardian homes for industry owners and, increasingly, on the expansion of higher education centres, researchers and lecturers.

In August 2006, following a torrential downpour of rain, the main street of Earlsdon suffered from serious flooding. Many businesses were affected, and some were forced to close for a time.

== Places of interest ==
The hub of Earlsdon is what is locally referred to as the "Earlsdon High Street", in reality Earlsdon Street. This is a strip of commercial units that includes a number of restaurants and pubs. The area surrounding Earlsdon Street consists of rows of terraced houses and a few small shops. In the south of the locality is the large civic landscaped War Memorial Park, the north abuts Hearsall Common, and Canley Ford abuts the west.

== Frank Whittle ==
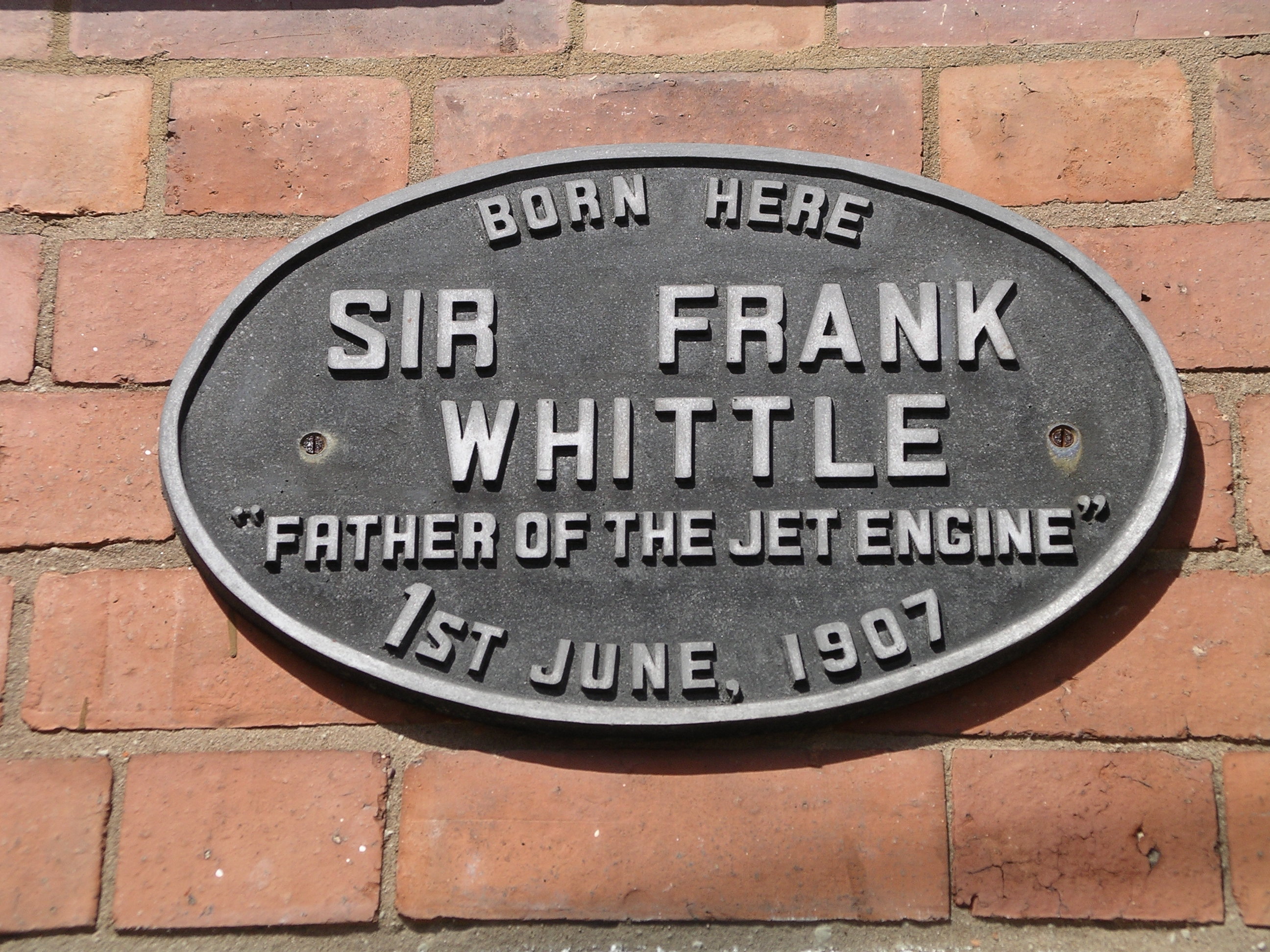
The commemorative plaque on the house where Whittle was born and grew up.

Sir Frank Whittle (1907–96), the jet engine pioneer, was born in Earlsdon in a terraced house on Newcombe Road, which is marked out by a small grey commemorative plaque. He attended a school in Earlsdon, and he was inspired to pursue a career in engineering after allegedly seeing an aircraft land on Hearsall Common. At the age of nine he moved to Leamington Spa with his family when his father started an engineering factory there.

== Arts and culture ==
Earlsdon is home to two theatres, the Albany Theatre, a professional multi-purpose arts venue, as well as the Criterion Theatre,that puts on six main house performances a year, as well as numerous visiting companies and workshop productions. ECHO (Earlsdon, Chapelfields Hearsall Opinion) is the longest-running independent community newspaper in the country (http://www.echonews.org.uk). There is an annual "Earlsdon Festival", that takes place in Earlsdon Street and other locations nearby during the May Day bank holiday. The annual Godiva Festival takes place within the War Memorial Park usually during one week-end in July.

Since November 2022, the central area of Earlsdon has been designated as a conservation area by Coventry City Council.

== Demography ==
In 2024 the ONS estimated that the ward has a population of 15,458 across 6,197 households. 27% were one person households and 64.7% single family households. 83.3% of residents were born in the UK, compared to the national average of 82.6%. 76.1% of the ward is white with the largest minority group recorded as Asian, at 15.9% of the population. 49.6% of the ward have degree level qualifications.

== Governance ==
Earlsdon alongside the rest of Coventry is governed by metropolitan borough Coventry City Council and makes up part of the West Midlands Combined Authority, which is led by the directly elected Mayor of the West Midlands. The suburb gives it name to the Earlsdon ward for elections to the local authority and is represented by 3 councillors. As of the most recent local elections in 2026 the ward is represent by 3 Labour councillors: Dr Kindy Sandhu, Dr Lynette Kelly and Antony Tucker. The majority of Earlsdon lies in the Coventry South parilamentary constituency and is currently represented by Zarah Sultana of Your Party.

The northern part of Earlsdon near Hearsall Common fall under Whoberley Ward and are also represented by 3 Labour councillors Pervez Akhtar, Jayne Innes and Julie Jones. This area lies within the Coventry North West parliamentary constituency and is currently represented by Taiwo Owatemi of the Labour Party.

=== Administrative History ===
Earlsdon was incorporated into Coventry in 1890 when the city boundary was extended. Alongside the rest of Coventry, Earlsdon was a part of Warwickshire until local government reorganisation in 1974 and has seen been within the West Midlands.

== Gallery ==
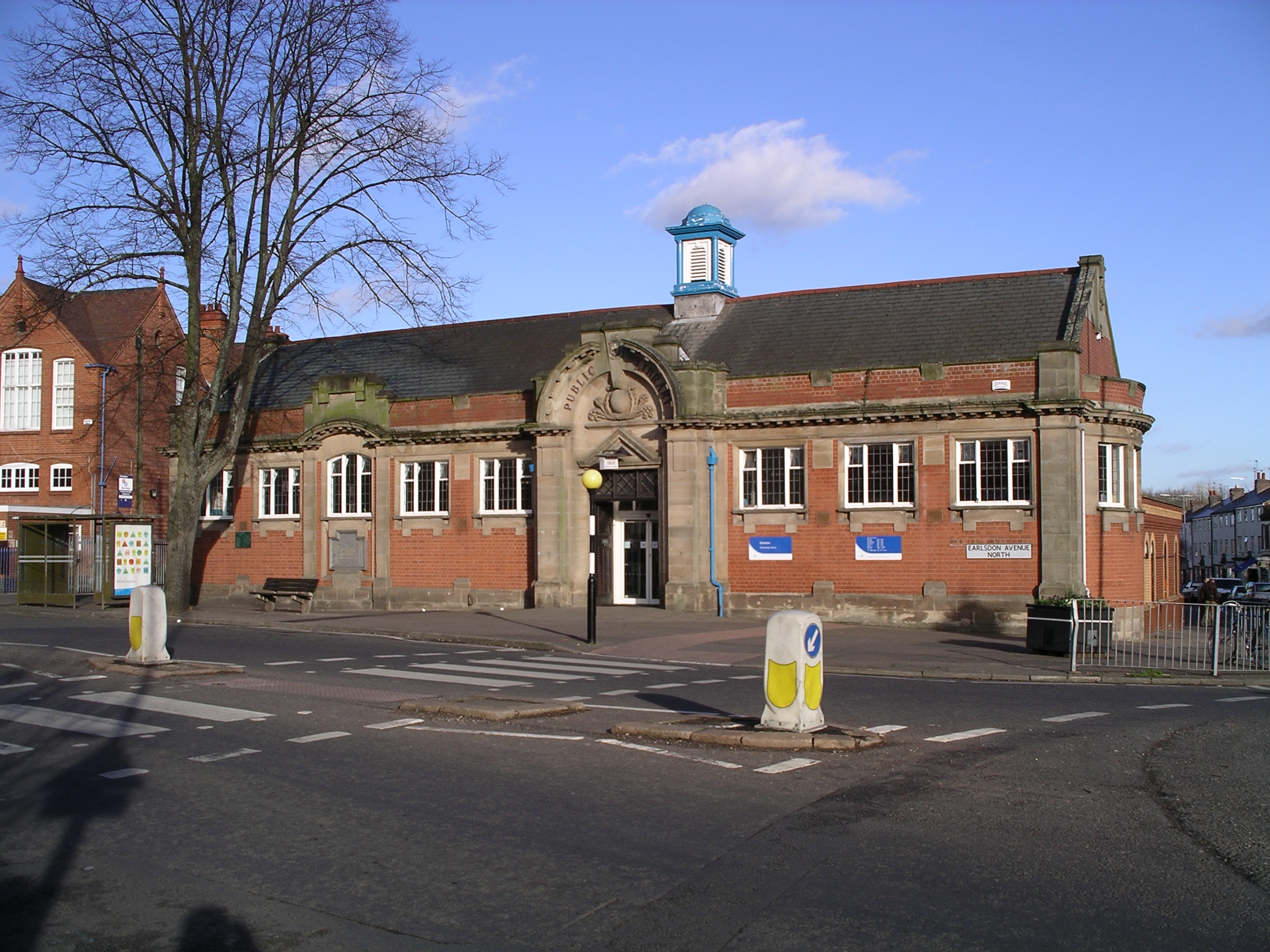
Earlsdon library

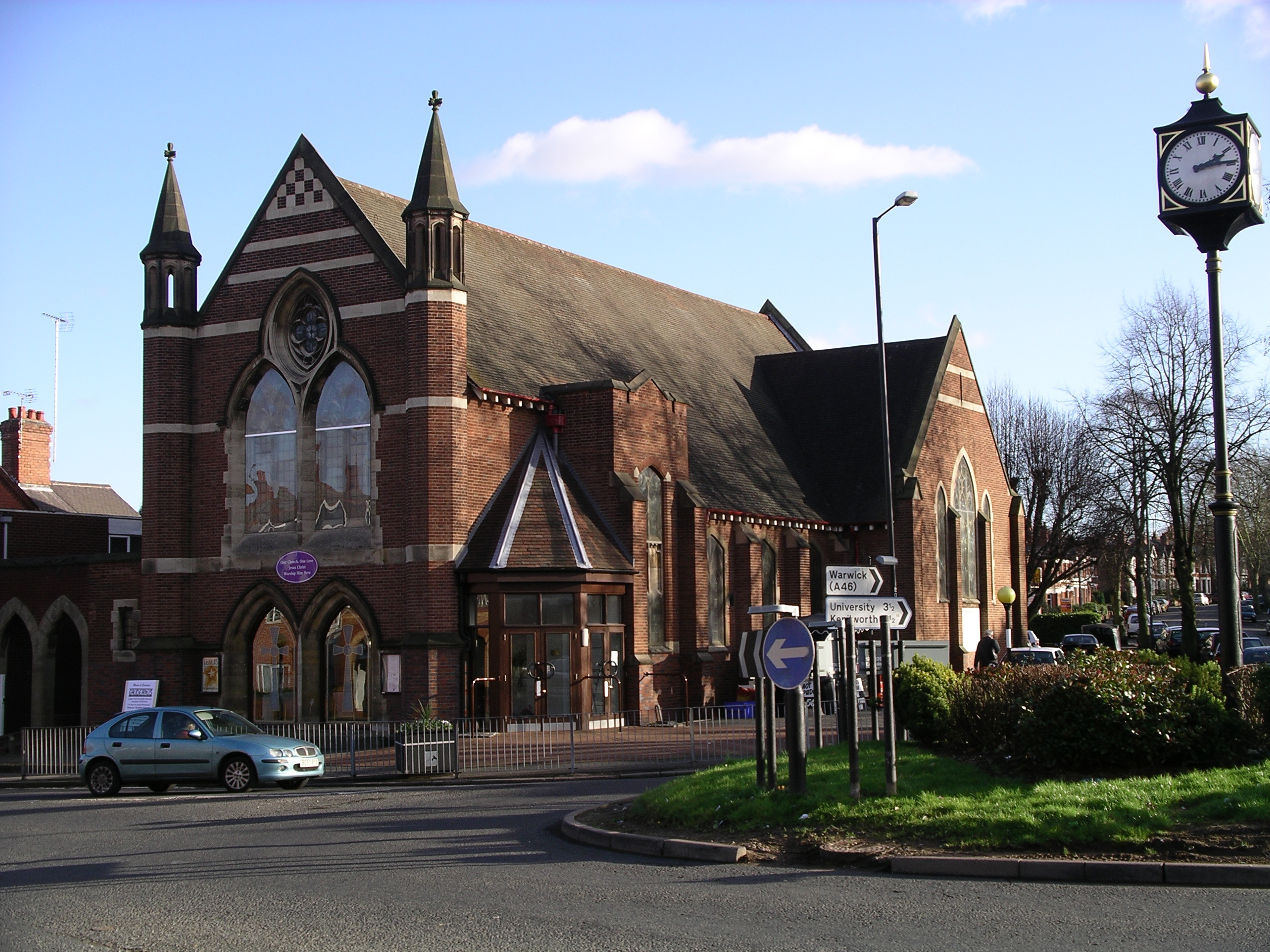
Earlsdon Methodist Church

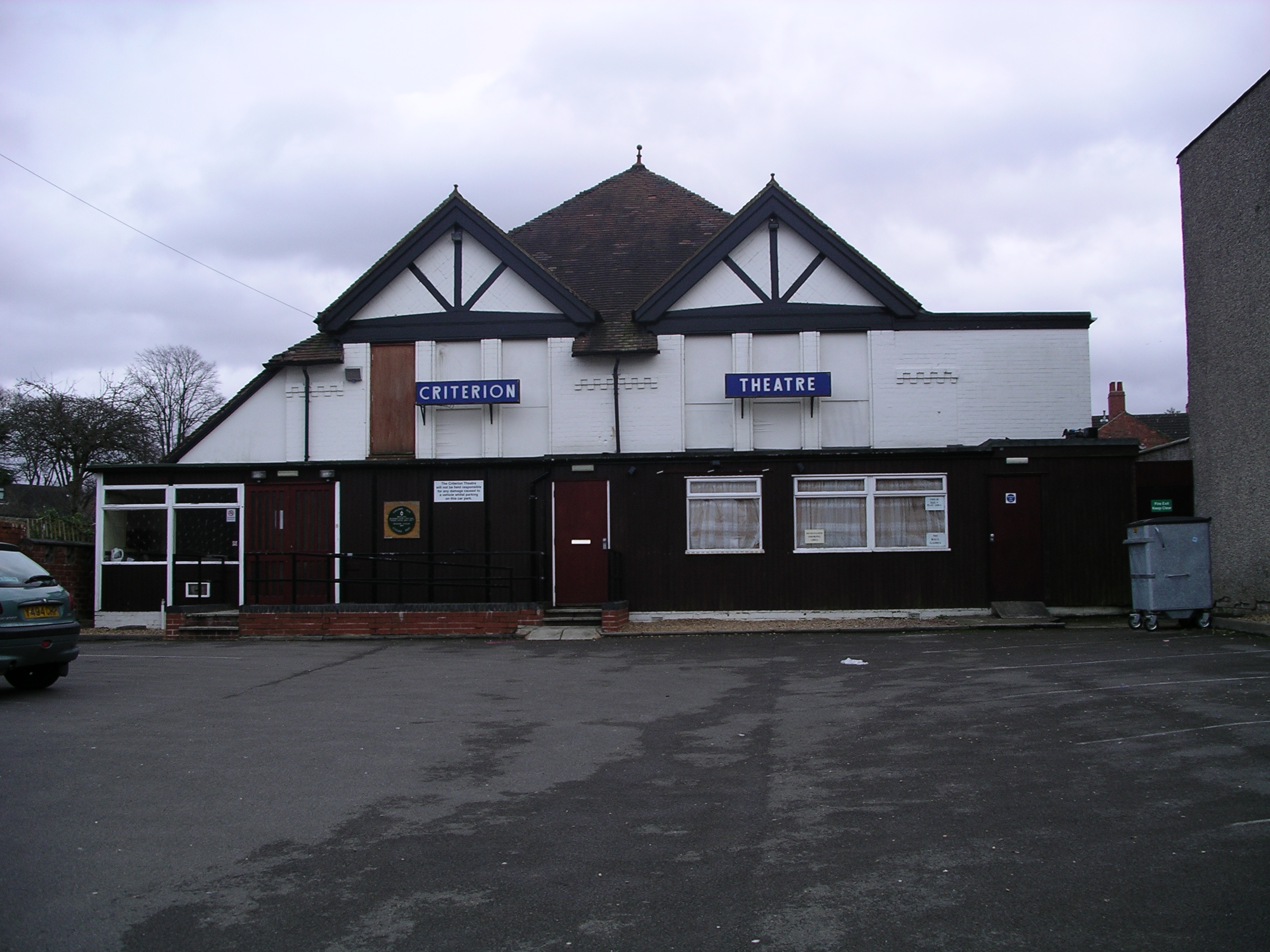
Criterion Theatre

== See also ==
- St Barbara's Church, Earlsdon
