= George Wagstaffe =

English sculptor (born 1939)

- Born: 1939 (age 85–86)
- Occupation: Artist Sculptor Painter
- Known for: The Phoenix Coventry Cross Naiad

George Wagstaffe (born 1939) is an English sculptor based in Coventry. He is predominantly known for his three iconic pieces of public art for the redevelopment of Coventry City Centre in the 1960s such as the Phoenix in Hertfort Street, Naiad in the Upper Precinct, and his replica of the Coventry Cross outside Holy Trinity Church, which was temporarily removed in 2019, before being reinstated in a more prominent location in 2023.

== Early life ==
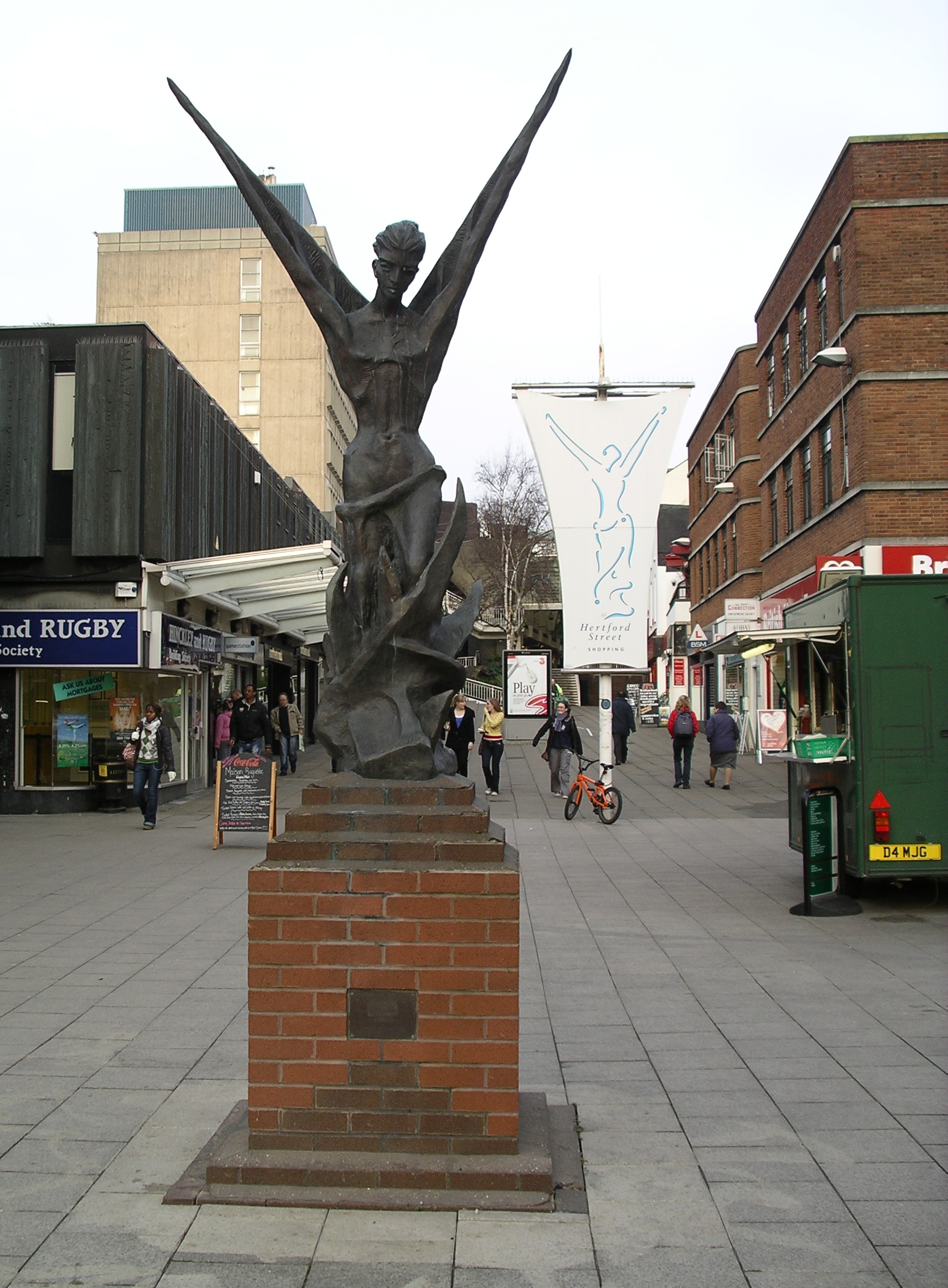
The Phoenix

George Wagstaffe was born in 1939 and during World War II was a witness to the destruction and devastation of the 1940 Blitz. He studied at Coventry College of Arts from 1955 to 1960. He also attended a few courses at Leicester College of Art and Slade School of Fine Art, University College, London. He won the Sculpture Prize for his sculpture, Naiad in the Young Contemporaries exhibition held at the Institute of Contemporary Arts in London in 1957 or 1958. The Coventry City architect, Arthur Ling, saw the Naiad at ICA, and as a result in 1960 Coventry City Council commissioned a bronze copy of Naiad for Earl Street Courtyard, Coventry. The Coventry City Council also commissioned the Phoenix in Hertford Street in 1962. Wagstaffe has since worked on several local or national commissions such as ecclesiastical commissions in 1972 and 1973 and commissions in Shell Chemical Headquarters, Chester, in 1989. He worked as a lecturer at Lanchester Polytechnic from 1961 to 1964, and as a visiting lecturer at the Mid-Warwickshire College of Art.

== Works ==
The influence of destruction and devastation of the 1940 Blitz is expressed in George's works in the form of themes such as death, rebirth and resurrection. All of his works centers around the theme of brutality and fragility of life and nature, and the battles that life creates.

=== Phoenix ===
Phoenix was commissioned in 1962 during the post-war reconstruction of Coventry, symbolizing the rebuilding of the city like a mythical Phoenix rising out of ashes. It was unveiled in May 1962 by H.R.H. Princess Margaret and had the appearance of being under construction. The sculpture functions both as a memorial and as a symbol of rebirth and resurrection. It was changed from a bird to a young person to represent the new city and its people rising from the ashes of the burnt and bombed city. The sculpture was first made in resin and metal but later changed to bronze cast in 1987 after weather damage. It is currently located on Hertford Street on a brick plinth.

=== Coventry Cross ===
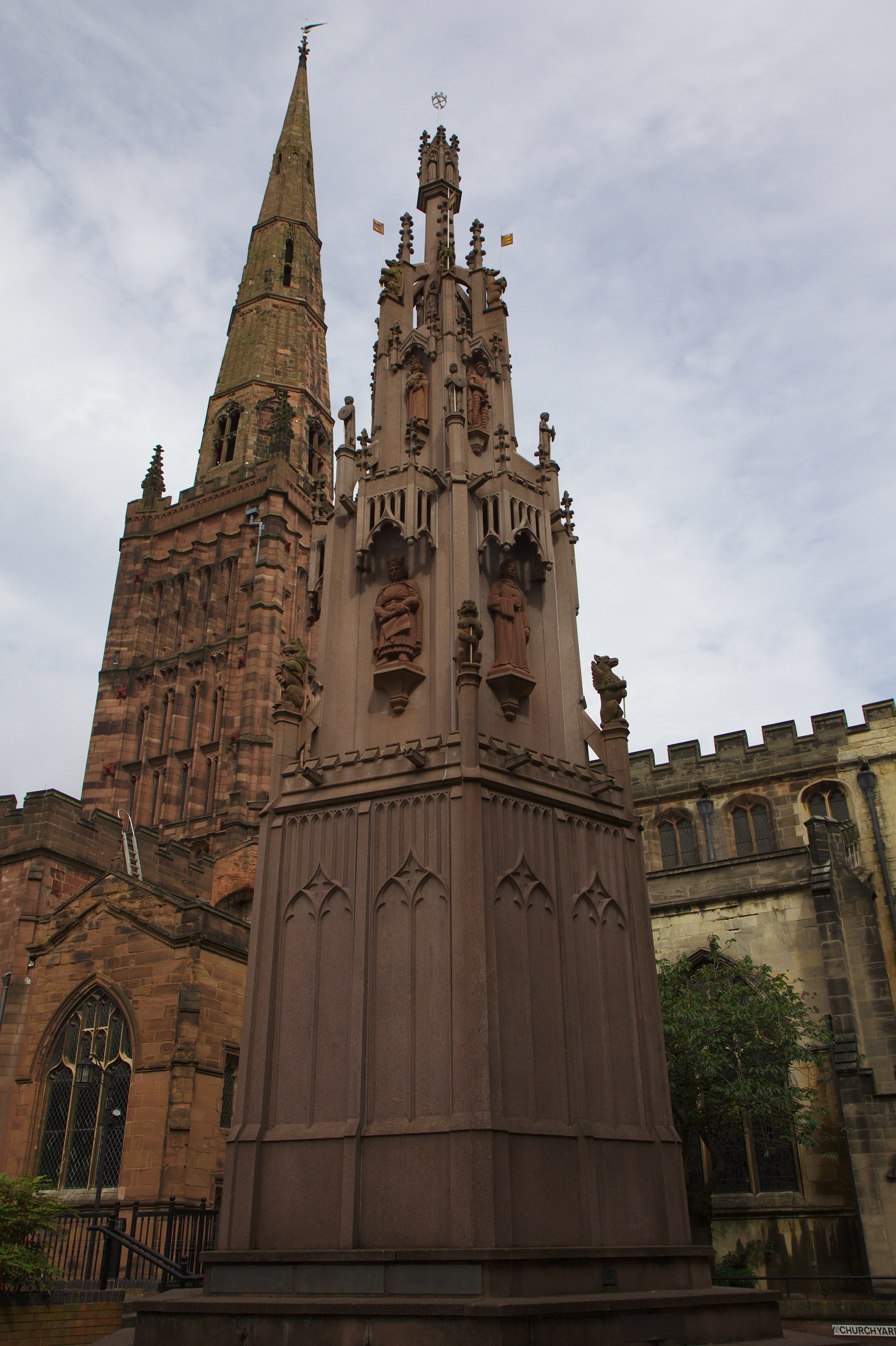
Wagstaffe's Coventry Cross, seen in 2012

The modern replica of Coventry Cross was funded by "The Coventry Boy Foundation", and commissioned after 1971 when the plans were discussed by the Coventry Civic Amenities Society (now the Coventry Society) and the Church authorities. It stood next to Holy Trinity Church, 100 metres away from the original site of the old cross. The sculpture was mainly made from cast ferro-concrete, making it different from the old cross.

The replica had the height of 17.4 metres (57 feet), twenty niche with multiple figures and four diminishing sections. The top three sections were decorated with multiple statues. The bottom section had statues depicting kings such as Henry VI, John, Edward I, Henry II, Richard I and Henry IV or Henry I. The second row has figures of St. George, Edward III, St. John, St. Michael, Christ and Henry III, and boys holding pennons. The top section has figures of three saints - St. Christopher, St. James, and St. Peter, and three monks - a Benedictine, a Whitefriar and a Greyfriar with statues of a lion, bull, greyhound and dragon with pennons. The final lantern included 6 angels. The cross was neither painted nor gilded.

It was removed in 2019. It is now being rebuilt on Broadgate, not far from its original location.
