= Frank Whittle =

British Royal Air Force engineer and air officer (1907–1996)

Air Commodore Sir Frank Whittle OM KBE CB FRS FRAeS
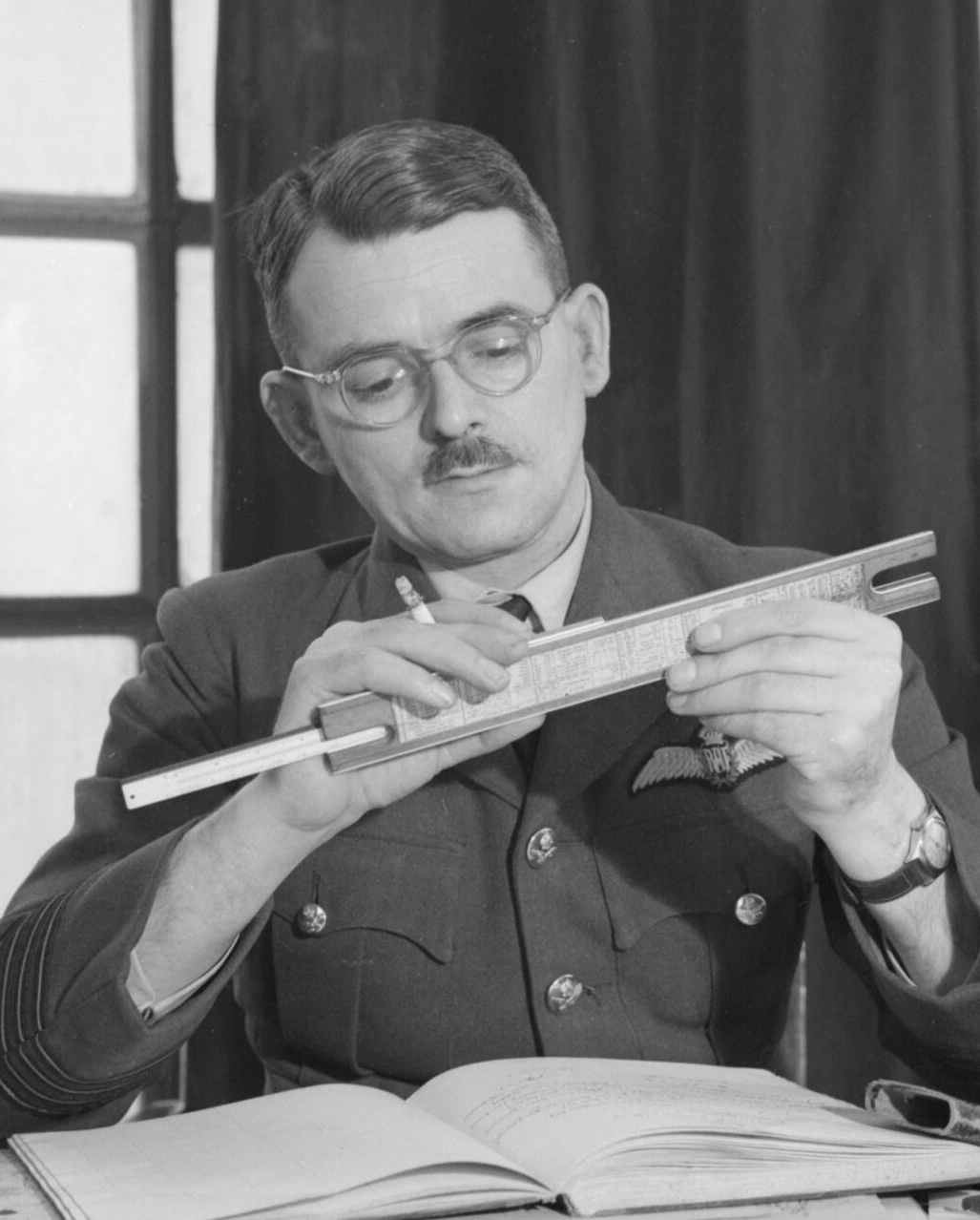
- Whittle in 1943
- Born: 1 June 1907; Coventry, Warwickshire, England
- Died: 8 August 1996 (aged 89); Columbia, Maryland, US
- Burial place: Cranwell, England
- Spouses: Dorothy Lee (m. 1930; div. 1976) Hazel Hall (m. 1976)
- Military career
- Allegiance: United Kingdom
- Branch: Royal Air Force
- Service years: 1923–1948
- Rank: Air Commodore
- Conflicts: Second World War
- Awards: Member of the Order of Merit; Knight Commander of the Order of the British Empire; Companion of the Order of the Bath; Commander of the Legion of Merit (United States); Rumford Medal; Louis E. Levy Medal; Fellow of the Royal Society; Honorary Fellow of the Royal Aeronautical Society; Charles Stark Draper Prize; Prince Philip Medal
- Other work: BOAC technical advisor, Shell engineer, engineer for Bristol Aero Engines, NAVAIR Professor at the US Naval Academy

Air Commodore Sir Frank Whittle (1 June 1907 – 8 August 1996) was an English engineer, inventor and Royal Air Force (RAF) air officer. He is credited with co-creating the turbojet engine. A patent was submitted by Maxime Guillaume in 1921 for a similar invention which was technically unfeasible at the time. Whittle's jet engines were developed some years earlier than those of Germany's Hans von Ohain, who designed the first-to-fly turbojet engine as well as Austria’s Anselm Franz.

Whittle demonstrated an aptitude for engineering and an interest in flying from an early age. At first he was turned down by the RAF but, determined to join the force, he overcame his physical limitations and was accepted and sent to No. 2 School of Technical Training to join No 1 Squadron of Cranwell Aircraft Apprentices. He was taught the theory of aircraft engines and gained practical experience in the engineering workshops. His academic and practical abilities as an Aircraft Apprentice earned him a place on the officer training course at Cranwell. He excelled in his studies and became an accomplished pilot. While writing his thesis he formulated the fundamental concepts that led to the creation of the turbojet engine, taking out a patent on his design in 1930. His performance on an officers' engineering course earned him a place on a further course at Peterhouse, Cambridge, where he graduated with a First.

Without Air Ministry support, he and two retired RAF servicemen formed Power Jets Ltd to build his engine with assistance from the firm of British Thomson-Houston. Despite limited funding, a prototype was created, which first ran in 1937. Official interest was forthcoming following this success, with contracts being placed to develop further engines, but the continuing stress seriously affected Whittle's health, eventually resulting in a nervous breakdown in 1940. In 1944 when Power Jets was nationalised he again suffered a nervous breakdown, and resigned from the board in 1946.

In 1948, Whittle retired from the RAF and received a knighthood. He joined BOAC as a technical advisor before working as an engineering specialist with Shell, followed by a position with Bristol Aero Engines. After emigrating to the U.S. in 1976 he accepted the position of NAVAIR Research Professor at the United States Naval Academy from 1977 to 1979. In August 1996, Whittle died of lung cancer at his home in Columbia, Maryland. In 2002, Whittle was ranked number 42 in the BBC poll of the 100 Greatest Britons.

== Early life ==
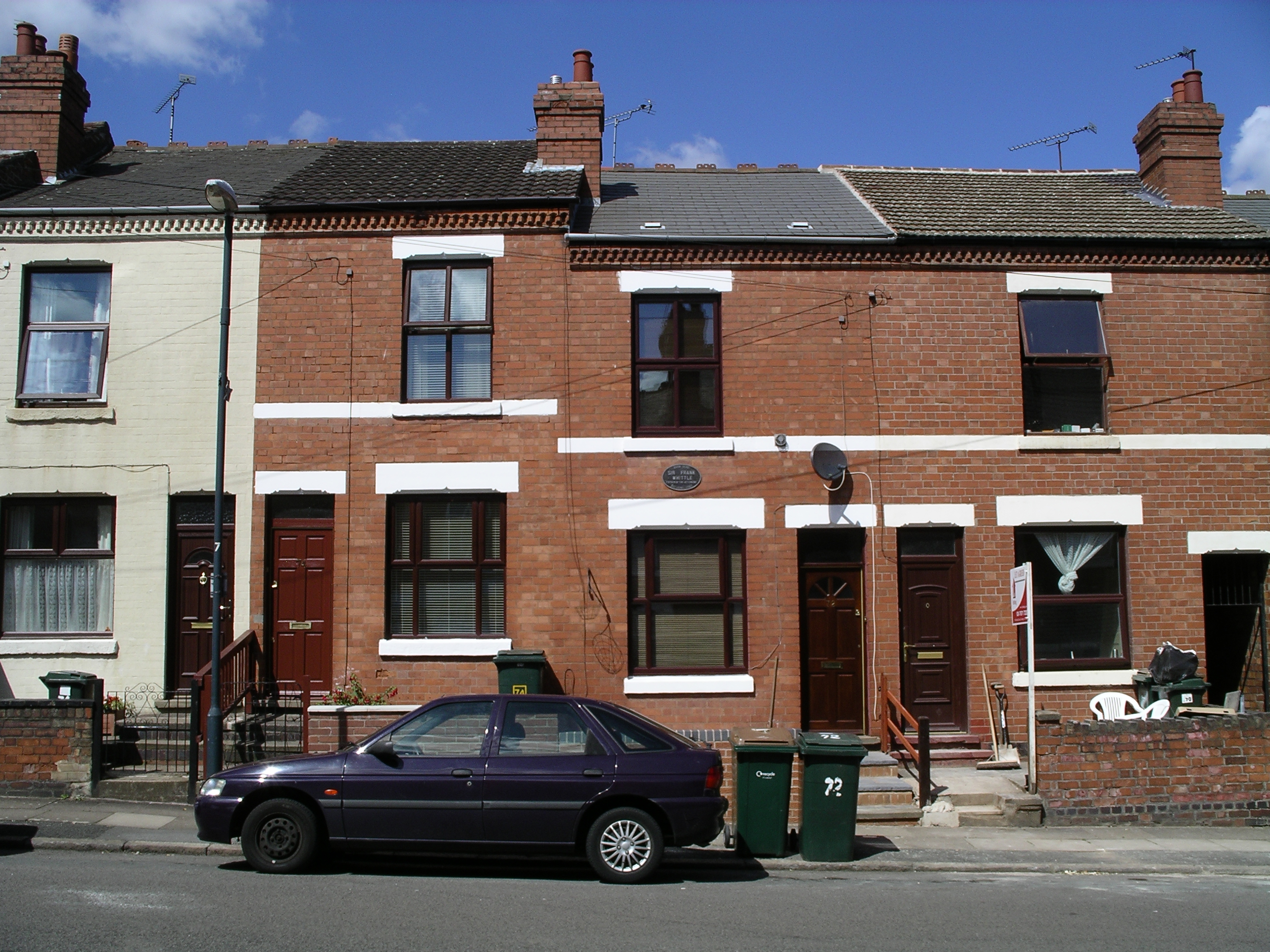
Whittle's birthplace in Earlsdon, Coventry, England. (photo 2007)

Whittle was born in a terraced house in Newcombe Road, Earlsdon, Coventry, England, on 1 June 1907, the eldest son of Moses Whittle and Sara Alice Garlick. When he was nine years old, the family moved to the nearby town of Royal Leamington Spa where his father, a highly inventive practical engineer and mechanic, purchased the Leamington Valve and Piston Ring Company in Clinton Street, which comprised a few lathes and other tools and a single-cylinder gas engine, on which Whittle became an expert. Whittle developed a rebellious and adventurous streak, together with an early interest in aviation.

After two years attending Milverton School, Whittle won a scholarship to a secondary school which in due course became Leamington College for Boys, but when his father's business faltered there was not enough money to keep him there. He quickly developed practical engineering skills while helping in his father's workshop, and being an enthusiastic reader spent much of his spare time in the Leamington reference library, reading about astronomy, engineering, turbines, and the theory of flight. At the age of 15, determined to be a pilot, Whittle applied to join the RAF.

== Entering the RAF ==
In January 1923, having passed the RAF entrance examination with a high mark, Whittle reported to RAF Halton in Buckinghamshire as an Aircraft Apprentice. He lasted only two days: just five feet tall and with a small chest measurement, he failed the medical. He then put himself through a vigorous training programme and special diet devised by a physical training instructor at Halton to build up his physique, only to fail again six months later, when he was told that he could not be given a second chance, despite having added three inches to his height and chest. Undeterred, he applied again under an assumed name and presented himself as a candidate at the No 2 School of Technical Training RAF Cranwell. This time he passed the physical and, in September that year, 364365 Boy Whittle, F, started his three-year training as an aircraft mechanic in No. 1 Squadron of No. 4 Apprentices Wing, RAF Cranwell, because RAF Halton No. 1 School of Technical Training was unable to accommodate all the aircraft apprentices at that time.

Whittle hated the strict discipline imposed on apprentices and, convinced there was no hope of ever becoming a pilot, he at one time seriously considered deserting. However, throughout his early days as an aircraft apprentice (and at the Royal Air Force College Cranwell), he maintained his interest in model aircraft and joined the Model Aircraft Society, where he built working replicas. The quality of these attracted the eye of the Apprentice Wing commanding officer, who noted that Whittle was also a mathematical genius. He was so impressed that in 1926 he recommended Whittle for officer training at RAF College Cranwell.

For Whittle, this was the chance of a lifetime, not only to enter the commissioned ranks but also because the training included flying lessons on the Avro 504. While at Cranwell he lodged in a bungalow at Dorrington. Being an ex-apprentice amongst a majority of ex-public schoolboys, life as an officer cadet was not easy for him, but he nevertheless excelled in the courses and went solo in 1927 after only 13.5 hours’ instruction, quickly progressing to the Bristol Fighter and gaining a reputation for daredevil low flying and aerobatics.

A requirement of the course was that each student had to produce a thesis for graduation: Whittle decided to write his on potential aircraft design developments, notably flight at high altitudes and speeds over 500 mph (800 km/h). In Future Developments in Aircraft Design he showed that incremental improvements in existing propeller engines were unlikely to make such flight routine. Instead he described what is today referred to as a motorjet; an air compressor using a conventional piston engine to provide compressed air to a combustion chamber whose exhaust was used directly for thrust – essentially an afterburner attached to a piston engine driven air compressor. The idea was not new and had been talked about for some time in the industry, but Whittle's aim was to demonstrate that at increased altitudes the lower outside air density would increase the design's efficiency. For long-range flight, using an Atlantic-crossing mailplane as his example, the engine would spend most of its time at high altitude and thus could outperform a conventional powerplant. According to Whittle, "...I came to the general conclusion that if very high speeds were to be combined with long range, it would be necessary to fly at very great height, where the low air density would greatly reduce resistance in proportion to speed."

Of the few apprentices accepted into the Royal Air Force College, Whittle graduated in 1928 at the age of 21 and was commissioned as a pilot officer in July. He ranked second in his class in academics, won the Andy Fellowes Memorial Prize for Aeronautical Sciences for his thesis, and was described as an "exceptional to above average" pilot. However, his flight logbook also showed numerous red ink warnings about showboating and overconfidence, and because of dangerous flying in an Armstrong Whitworth Siskin he was disqualified from the end-of-term flying contest.

== Development of the turbojet engine ==
Whittle continued working on the motorjet principle after his thesis work but eventually abandoned it when further calculations showed it would weigh as much as a conventional engine of the same thrust. Pondering the problem he thought: "Why not substitute a turbine for the piston engine?" Instead of using a piston engine driven compressor to provide the compressed air for the burner, a turbine could be used to extract some power from the exhaust and drive a compressor, similar as in a turbocharger. The remaining exhaust thrust would power the aircraft.

On 27 August 1928, Pilot Officer Whittle joined No. 111 Squadron, Hornchurch, flying Siskin IIIs. His continuing reputation for low flying and aerobatics provoked a public complaint that almost led to his being court-martialled. Within a year he was posted to the Central Flying School, then at RAF Wittering, for a flying instructor's course. He became a popular and gifted instructor, and was selected as one of the entrants in a competition to select a team to perform the "crazy flying" routine in the 1930 Royal Air Force Air Display at RAF Hendon. He destroyed two aircraft in accidents during rehearsals but remained unscathed on both occasions. After the second incident an enraged Flight Lieutenant Harold W. Raeburn said furiously, "Why don't you take all my bloody aeroplanes, make a heap of them in the middle of the aerodrome and set fire to them – it's quicker!"

Whittle showed his engine concept around the base, where it attracted the attention of Flying Officer Pat Johnson, formerly a patent examiner. Johnson, in turn, took the concept to the commanding officer of the base. This set in motion a chain of events that almost led to the engines being produced much sooner than actually occurred.

Earlier, in July 1926, A. A. Griffith had published a paper on compressors and turbines, which he had been studying at the Royal Aircraft Establishment (RAE). He showed that such designs up to this point had been flying "stalled", and that by giving the compressor blades an aerofoil-shaped cross-section their efficiency could be dramatically improved. The paper went on to describe how the increased efficiency of these sorts of compressors and turbines would allow a jet engine to be produced, although he felt the idea was impractical, and instead suggested using the power as a turboprop. At the time most superchargers used a centrifugal compressor, so there was limited interest in the paper.

Encouraged by his commanding officer, in late 1929 Whittle sent his concept to the Air Ministry to see if it would be of any interest to them. Whittle was invited to the Ministry and met an officer of the Ministry's Department of Scientific and Industrial Research (DSIR) and Griffith (at the time a member of the Aeronautical Research Committee). Afterwards, Whittle received a letter from Griffith, who was of the opinion that Whittle's "simple" design could not achieve the sort of efficiencies needed for a practical engine. After pointing out an error in one of Whittle's calculations, Griffith went on to comment that the centrifugal design would be too large for aircraft use and that using the jet directly for power would be rather inefficient. Griffith called the design "impracticable," as current materials could not achieve the high temperatures. Griffith did say "the internal combustion turbine will almost certainly be developed into a successful engine, but before this can be done the performance of both compressors and turbines will have to be greatly improved. However it has been of real interest to investigate your scheme and I can assure you that any suggestion submitted by people in the Service is always welcome."

Whittle received a report noting the limitations of his concept. The report said "the internal combustion turbine will not be rendered practical by the revolutionary design of some lucky inventor. The steam turbine engineer and the metallurgist ... are the people with whom the future development of the turbine rests" Whittle recorded that he found the response depressing.

Pat Johnson remained convinced of the validity of the idea, and had Whittle patent the idea in January 1930. Since the RAF was not interested in the concept they did not declare it secret, meaning that Whittle was able to retain the rights to the idea, which would have otherwise been their property. Johnson arranged a meeting with British Thomson-Houston (BTH), whose chief turbine engineer seemed to agree with the basic idea. However, BTH did not want to spend the £60,000 it would cost to develop it, and this potential brush with early success went no further.

In January 1930, Whittle was promoted to flying officer. In Coventry, on 24 May 1930, Whittle married his fiancée, Dorothy Mary Lee, with whom he later had two sons, David and Ian. Then, in 1931, he was posted to the Marine Aircraft Experimental Establishment at Felixstowe as an armament officer and test pilot of seaplanes, where he continued to publicise his idea. This posting came as a surprise for he had never previously flown a seaplane, but he nevertheless increased his reputation as a pilot by flying some 20 different types of floatplanes, flying boats, and amphibians.

While at Felixstowe, Whittle met with the firm of Armstrong Siddeley, and their technical advisor W.S. Farren. The firm rejected Whittle's proposal, doubting material was available to sustain the required very high temperatures. Whittle's turbojet proposal required a compressor with a pressure ratio of 4:1, while the best current supercharger had only half that value. Besides publishing a paper on superchargers, Whittle wrote The Case for the Gas Turbine. According to John Golley, "The paper contained example calculations which showed the big increase in efficiency which could be obtained with the gas turbine at great height due to the beneficial effects of low air temperature. It also contained calculations to demonstrate the degree to which range would depend on height with turbojet aircraft."

Every officer with a permanent commission was expected to take a specialist course, and as a result Whittle attended the Officers School of Engineering at RAF Henlow in 1932. He obtained an aggregate of 98% in all subjects in his entrance exam, which allowed him to complete a shortened one-year course. Whittle received a Distinction in every subject, except mechanical drawing, where he was described as "a very able student. He works hard and has originality. He is suitable for experimental duties."

His performance in the course was so exceptional that in 1934 he was permitted, though the scheme for RAF officers had been ended the year before, to take a two-year engineering course as a member of Peterhouse, the oldest college of Cambridge University, graduating in 1936 with a First in the Mechanical Sciences Tripos. The Ministry gave him permission to spend a further year after graduation working with the aerodynamicist Melvill Jones. On 1 February 1934, he was promoted to the rank of flight lieutenant.

=== Power Jets Ltd ===
Still at Cambridge, Whittle could ill afford the £5 renewal fee for his jet engine patent when it became due in January 1935, and because the Air Ministry refused to pay it the patent was allowed to lapse. Shortly afterwards, in May, he received mail from Rolf Dudley-Williams, who had been with him at Cranwell in the 1920s and Felixstowe in 1930. Williams arranged a meeting with Whittle, himself, and another by-then-retired RAF serviceman, James Collingwood Tinling. The two proposed a partnership that allowed them to act on Whittle's behalf to gather public financing so that development could go ahead. Whittle thought improvements to his original idea could be patented, noting, "Its virtue lies entirely in its extremely low weight, and that it will work at heights where atmospheric density is very low." This led to three provisional specifications being filed, as the group sought to develop a jet-propelled aeroplane. The arrangement was that Williams and Tinling would have a quarter share each of the commercial rights but they would not approach any existing company in the aircraft industry.

The agreement soon bore fruit, and in 1935, through Tinling's father, Whittle was introduced to Mogens L. Bramson, a well-known independent consulting aeronautical engineer and patent engineer. Bramson was initially sceptical but after studying Whittle's ideas became an enthusiastic supporter. Bramson introduced Whittle and his two associates to the investment bank O.T. Falk & Partners, where discussions took place with Lancelot Law Whyte and occasionally Sir Maurice Bonham-Carter. The firm had an interest in developing speculative projects that conventional banks would not touch. Whyte was impressed by the 28-year-old Whittle and his design when they met on 11 September 1935:

The impression he made was overwhelming, I have never been so quickly convinced, or so happy to find one's highest standards met... This was genius, not talent. Whittle expressed his idea with superb conciseness: 'Reciprocating engines are exhausted. They have hundreds of parts jerking to and fro, and they cannot be made more powerful without becoming too complicated. The engine of the future must produce 2,000 hp with one moving part: a spinning turbine and compressor.'

— Lancelot Law Whyte

However O.T. Falk & Partners specified they would only invest in Whittle's engine if they had independent verification that it was feasible. They financed an independent engineering review from Bramson (the historic "Bramson Report"), which was issued in November 1935. It was favourable and together with a letter of support for Whittle and the engine from Henry Tizard (chair of the Engine sub-committee of the Aeronautical Research Committee) in response to Whyte Falk then agreed to finance Whittle. With that the jet engine was finally on its way to becoming a reality.

On 27 January 1936, the principals signed the "Four Party Agreement", creating "Power Jets Ltd" which was incorporated in March 1936. The parties were O.T. Falk & Partners, the Air Ministry, Whittle and, together, Williams and Tinling. Falk was represented on the board of Power Jets by Whyte as chairman and Bonham-Carter as a director (with Bramson acting as alternate). Whittle, Williams and Tinling retained a 49% share of the company in exchange for Falk and Partners putting in £2,000 with the option of a further £18,000 within 18 months. As Whittle was still a full-time RAF officer and currently at Cambridge, he was given the title "Honorary Chief Engineer and Technical Consultant". Needing special permission to work outside the RAF, he was placed on the Special Duty List and allowed to work on the design as long as it was for no more than six hours a week. However he was allowed to continue at Cambridge for a year doing post-graduate work which gave him time to work on the turbojet.

The Air Ministry still saw little immediate value in the effort (they regarded it as long-range research and set up work on an axial flow turbine at the RAE with Hayne Constant in 1937), and having no production facilities of its own, Power Jets entered into an agreement with steam turbine specialists British Thomson-Houston (BTH) to build an experimental engine facility at a BTH factory in Rugby, Warwickshire. Work progressed quickly, and by the end of the year 1936 the prototype detail design was finalised and parts for it were well on their way to being completed, all within the original £2,000 budget. However, by 1936, Germany had also started working on jet engines (Herbert A. Wagner at Junkers and Hans von Ohain at Heinkel) and, although they too had difficulty overcoming conservatism, the German Ministry of Aviation (Reichsluftfahrtministerium) was more supportive than their British counterpart. Von Ohain applied for a patent for a turbojet engine in 1935 but having earlier reviewed and critiqued Whittle's patents, had to narrow the scope of his own filing. In Spain, air-force pilot and engineer Virgilio Leret Ruiz had been granted a patent for a jet engine in March 1935, and Republican president Manuel Azaña arranged for initial construction at the Hispano-Suiza aircraft factory in Madrid in 1936, but Leret was executed months later by Francoist Moroccan troops after commanding the defence of his seaplane base near Melilla at the onset of the Spanish Civil War. His plans were hidden from the Francoists and secretly handed to the British embassy in Madrid a few years later when his wife, Carlota O'Neill, was released from prison.

Despite lengthy delays in their own programme, the Luftwaffe beat the British efforts into the air by nine months. A lack of cobalt for high-temperature steel alloys meant the German designs were always at risk of overheating and damaging their turbines. The low-grade alloy production versions of the Junkers Jumo 004, designed by Dr. Anselm Franz and which powered the Messerschmitt Me 262 would typically last only 10–25 hours (longer with an experienced pilot) before burning out; if it was accelerated too quickly, the compressor would stall and power was immediately lost, and sometimes it exploded on their first startup. Over 200 German pilots were killed during training. Nevertheless, the Me 262 could fly far faster than allied planes and had very effective firepower. Although Me 262s were introduced late in the war they shot down 542 or more allied planes and in one allied bombing raid downed 32 of the 36 Boeing B-17 Flying Fortresses.

=== Financial difficulty ===
Earlier, in January, when the company formed, Henry Tizard, the rector of Imperial College London and chairman of the Aeronautical Research Committee (ARC), had prompted the Air Ministry's Director of Scientific Research to ask for a write-up of the design. The report was once again passed on to Griffith for comment, but was not received back until March 1937 by which point Whittle's design was well along. Griffith had already started construction of his own turbine engine design and, perhaps to avoid tainting his own efforts, he returned a somewhat more positive review. However, he remained highly critical of some features, notably the use of jet thrust. The Engine Sub-Committee of ARC studied Griffith's report, and decided to fund Griffith's effort instead. Given this astonishing display of official indifference, Falk and Partners gave notice that they could not provide funding beyond £5,000.

Nevertheless, the team pressed ahead, and the Power Jets WU (Whittle Unit, or W.U.) engine began test runs on 12 April 1937. Initially, the W.U. showed an alarming tendency to race out of control, due to issues with the fuel injection, before stable speeds were reached. However, by August, Whittle acknowledged a major reconstruction effort was needed to solve the combustion problem and compressor efficiency.

On 9 July, Falk & Partners gave the company an emergency loan of £250. On 27 July, Falk's option expired, but they agreed to continue financing Power Jets by loan. Also in July, Whittle's post-graduate stay at Cambridge was over, but then he was placed on the Special Duty List so he could work full-time on the engine. On 1 November, Williams, Tinling and Whittle took control of Power Jets. Whittle was promoted to squadron leader in December. Tizard pronounced it "streaks ahead" of any other advanced engine he had seen, and managed to interest the Air Ministry enough to fund development with a contract for £5,000 to develop a flyable version. However, it was not until March 1938 that a contract was signed, when Power Jets became subject to the Official Secrets Act, limiting the ability to raise additional funds. In January 1938, BTH invested £2,500.

In December 1937, Victor Crompton became Power Jets’ first employee, as an assistant to Whittle. Because of the hazardous nature of the work being carried out, development was moved largely from Rugby to BTH's lightly used Ladywood foundry at nearby Lutterworth in Leicestershire in 1938. Tests with a reconstructed W.U. engine commenced on 16 April 1938, and proceeded until a catastrophic failure of the turbine on 6 May. Yet, the engine ran for 1 hour and 45 minutes, and generated a thrust of 480 pounds-force (2,100 N) at 13,000 rpm. Another W.U. engine reconstruction was started on 30 May 1938, but using ten combustion chambers to match the ten compressor discharge ducts. Avoiding a single large combustion chamber made the engine lighter and more compact. Tests commenced with this third W.U. on 26 October 1938.

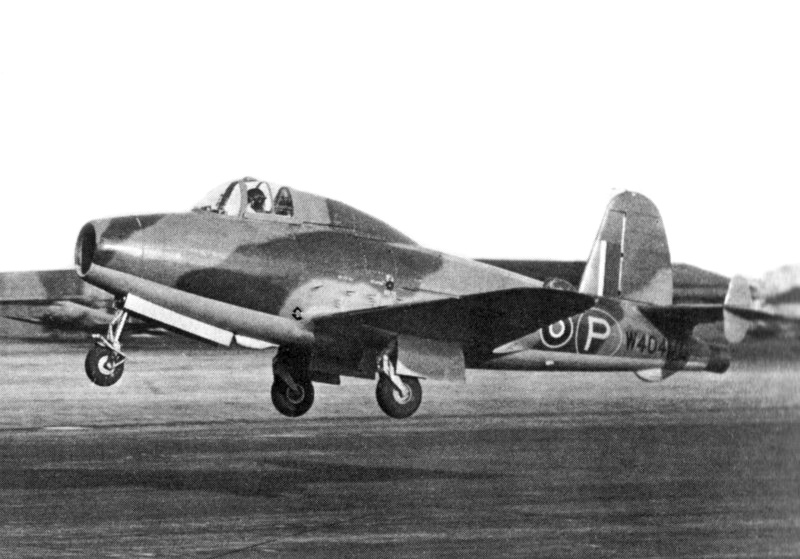
The Gloster E.28/39, the first British aircraft to fly with a turbojet engine

These delays and the lack of funding slowed the project. In Germany, Hans von Ohain had filed for a patent in 1935, which in 1939, led to the world's first flyable jet aircraft, the Heinkel He 178, powered by the Heinkel HeS 3. There is little doubt that Whittle's efforts would have been at the same level or even more advanced had the Air Ministry taken a greater interest in the design. When war broke out in September 1939, Power Jets had a payroll of only 10 and Griffith's operations at the RAE and Metropolitan-Vickers were similarly small.

Whittle's smoking increased to three packs a day and he suffered from various stress-related ailments such as frequent severe headaches, indigestion, insomnia, anxiety, eczema and heart palpitations, while his weight dropped to nine stone (126 lb / 57 kg). To keep to his 16-hour workdays, he sniffed benzedrine during the day and then took tranquillisers and sleeping pills at night to offset the effects and allow him to sleep. He admitted later he had become addicted to benzedrine. Over this period he became irritable and developed an "explosive" temper.

=== Changing fortunes ===
On 30 June 1939, Power Jets could barely afford to keep the lights on when yet another visit was made by Air Ministry personnel. This time Whittle was able to run the third reconstructed W.U. at 16,000 rpm for 20 minutes without any difficulty. One of the members of the team was the Director of Scientific Research, David Randall Pye, who walked out of the demonstration utterly convinced of the importance of the project. The Ministry agreed to buy the W.U. and then lend it back to them, injecting cash, and placed an order for a flyable version of the engine, referred to as the Power Jets W.1 and Power Jets W.2. By then, the Ministry had a tentative contract with the Gloster Aircraft Company for a simple aircraft specifically to flight-test the W.1, the single-engine Gloster E.28/39.

Whittle had already studied the problem of turning the massive W.U. into a flyable design, with what he described as very optimistic targets, to power a little aeroplane weighing 2,000 lb with a static thrust of 1,389 lb. The designed maximum thrust for the W.1 was 1,240 pounds-force (5,500 N), while that for the W.2, was 1,600 pounds-force (7,100 N) The W.2 was to be flown in the twin-engine Gloster Meteor fighter, at the time known by its Air Ministry specification as the F.9/40, but the engine was replaced with the W.2B, having a designed static thrust of 1,800 pounds-force (8,000 N). An experimental version of the W.1, designated W.1X, was used as a mock-up for the E.28 installation. A second E.28 was powered by the W.1A, that incorporated W.2 features such as air cooling of the turbine and a different compressor intake. On 26 March 1940, the jet engine was listed as a potential war winner by Air Marshal Tedder, and given the associated priority.

Power Jets also spent some time in May 1940 drawing up the W.2Y, a similar design with a "straight-through" airflow that resulted in a longer engine and, more critically, a longer driveshaft but having a somewhat simpler layout. To reduce the weight of the driveshaft as much as possible, the W.2Y used a large diameter, thin-walled, shaft almost as large as the turbine disc, "necked down" at either end where it connected to the turbine and compressor.

In April, the Air Ministry issued contracts for W.2 production lines with a capacity of up to 3,000 engines a month in 1942, asking BTH, Vauxhall and the Rover Company to join. However, the contract was eventually taken up by Rover only. In June, Whittle received a promotion to wing commander.

On 19 July 1940, Power Jets abandoned effort to vaporize fuel, and adopted the controlled atomising burner for the combustion chamber, developed by Isaac Lubbock of Asiatic Petroleum Company (a joint venture of Shell and Royal Dutch) In the words of Whittle, "the introduction of the Shell system may be said to mark the point where combustion ceased to be an obstacle to development." The size of Power Jets also increased with the war effort, increasing from 25 employees in January 1940 to 70 in September 1940.

=== Rover ===
Meanwhile, work continued with the W.U., which eventually went through nine rebuilds in an attempt to solve the combustion problems that had dominated the testing. On 9 October the W.U. ran once again, this time equipped with Lubbock or "Shell" atomising-burner combustion chambers. Combustion problems ceased to be an obstacle to development of the engine although intensive development was started on all features of the new combustion chambers.

By this point it was clear that Gloster's first airframe would be ready long before Rover could deliver an engine. Unwilling to wait, Whittle cobbled together an engine from spare parts, creating the W.1X ("X" standing for "experimental") which ran for the first time on 14 December 1940. Shortly afterwards an application for a US patent was made by Power Jets for an "Aircraft propulsion system and power unit"

The W.1X engine powered the E.28/39 for taxi testing on 7 April 1941 at Brockworth near the factory in Gloucester, where it took to the air for two or three short hops of several hundred yards at about six feet from the ground.

The definitive W.1 of 850 lbf (3.8 kN) thrust ran on 12 April 1941, and on 15 May the W.1-powered E.28/39 took off from Cranwell at 7:40 pm, flying for 17 minutes and reaching a maximum speed of around 340 mph (545 km/h). At the end of the flight, Pat Johnson, who had encouraged Whittle for so long said to him, "Frank, it flies." Whittle replied, "Well, that's what it was bloody well designed to do, wasn't it?"

Within days the aircraft was reaching 370 mph (600 km/h) at 25,000 feet (7,600 m), exceeding the performance of the contemporary Supermarine Spitfire fighters. Success of the design was now evident, and in 1941, Rolls-Royce, Hawker Siddeley, the Bristol Aeroplane Company, and de Havilland became interested in gas turbine aircraft propulsion. Under Harold Roxbee Cox, the Gas Turbine Collaboration Committee was created to give a forum for all the companies for exchange of information.

The stress on Whittle was expressed in a 27 May 1941 letter to Henry Tizard:

The responsibility that rests on my shoulders is very heavy indeed. We are faced with two alternatives – either we place a powerful weapon in the hands of the Royal Air Force or, if we fail to get our results in time, we may have falsely raised hopes and caused action to be taken which may deprive the Royal Air Force of hundreds of aeroplanes that it badly needs.

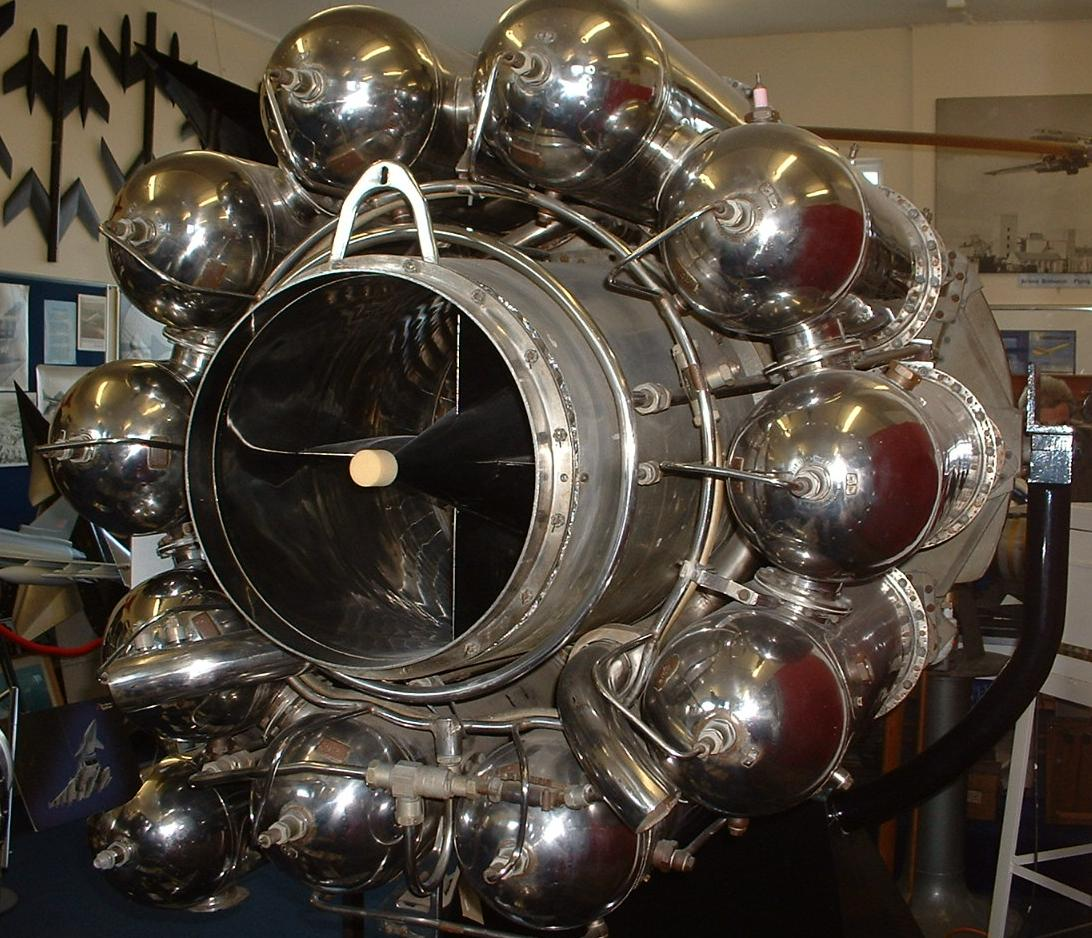
The W2/700 engine, or W.2B/23 as it was known to the Air Ministry. It was the first British production jet engine, powering early models of the Gloster Meteor.

In mid-1941, relations between Power Jets and Rover had continued to deteriorate. Rover had established a version of Power Jet's set-up at Waterloo Mill, associated with their Barnoldswick factory, near Clitheroe. Rover was working on an alternative to Whittle's "reverse-flow" combustion chambers, by developing a "straight-through" combustion chamber and turbine wheel. Rover referred to the engine as the B.26, sanctioned by the Directorate of Engine Development, but kept secret until April 1942, from Power Jets, the Controller of Research and Development, and the Director of Scientific Research.

=== Rolls-Royce ===
Earlier, in January 1940, Whittle had met Stanley Hooker of Rolls-Royce, who in turn introduced Whittle to Rolls-Royce board member and manager of their Derby factory, Ernest Hives (later Lord Hives). Hooker was in charge of the supercharger division at Rolls-Royce Derby and was a specialist in fluid dynamics. He had already increased the power of the Merlin piston engine by improving its supercharger. Such a speciality was naturally suited to the aero-thermodynamics of jet engines in which the optimisation of airflow in compressor, combustion chambers, turbine and jet pipe, is fundamental. Hives agreed to supply key parts to help the project. Also, Rolls-Royce built a compressor test rig which helped Whittle solve the surging problems (unstable airflow in the compressor) on the W.2 engine.

On 10 December 1941 Whittle suffered a nervous breakdown, and left work for a month. However, by the end of January 1942, Power Jets had three W.2B engines, two built by Rover. In February 1942, flight trials of the W.1A engine began in the E.28, which reached 430 mph (690 km/h) at 15,000 feet (4,600 m). On 13 March 1942, Whittle started work on a redesign of the W.2B, referred to as the W.2/500. On 13 September 1942, W.2/500 performance tests matched predictions, showing a thrust of 1,750 pounds-force (7,800 N) at full speed. In October 1941, the Ministry approved a new factory to be built outside Whetstone, Leicestershire.

From 3 June until 14 August 1942 Whittle visited the United States. At the General Electric's Lynn Factory, Whittle reviewed the Type I Supercharger, GE's code name for their jet engine, based on Power Jets' W.1X. An improved version of the W.2B would also be built, called the I-16, incorporating features of the W.2/500. Whittle also toured the Bell Aircraft, and the three Bell XP-59A Airacomets, a twin-engine fighter powered by the General Electric I-A jet engines. This fighter took flight in October 1942, one year and one day after GE received Power Jets' W.1X.

On 11 December 1942 Whittle had a meeting with the chief executive of the Ministry of Aircraft Production Air Chief Marshal Wilfrid Freeman and Air Marshal Francis Linnell, Controller of Research and Development at MAP, According to Whittle, "He made it clear that he had definitely decided to transfer Barnoldswick and Clitheroe to Rolls-Royce management." Spencer Wilks of Rover met with Hives and Hooker at the "Swan and Royal" pub, in Clitheroe, near the Barnoldswick factory. By arrangement with the Ministry of Aircraft Production they traded the jet factory at Barnoldswick for Rolls-Royce's tank engine factory in Nottingham.Testing and production ramp-up was immediately accelerated. Adrian Lombard Rover's supervising engineer on the Whittle engines transferred to Rolls Royce to continue the role. By January 1943, Rolls-Royce had achieved 400 hours of run time, ten times Rover's number of the previous month, and in May 1943, the W.2B passed its first 100-hour development test at 1,600 pounds-force (7,100 N) of thrust.

When Rolls-Royce became involved, Ray Dorey, the manager of the company's Flight Centre at Hucknall Airfield on the north side of Nottingham, had a Whittle W.2B engine installed in the rear of a Vickers Wellington bomber. The installation was done by Vickers at Weybridge.

The engine was operated in flight by Flight Test Engineer W R (Bill) Grose. Grose had previously been involved in ground test running of the engine at Lutterworth or Rugby in which he had been made partially deaf by an engine malfunction in a test bay.

=== Whittle Residences and Family ===
From the end of 1937, when a Squadron Leader, Whittle lived at 'Broomfield' on Bilton Road, in Rugby. Both sons were at school in the town. He later briefly lived at 'Laurelcroft', 1 North Street, Kilsby until 1949. His son Ian later joined the RAF.

=== Continued impact ===
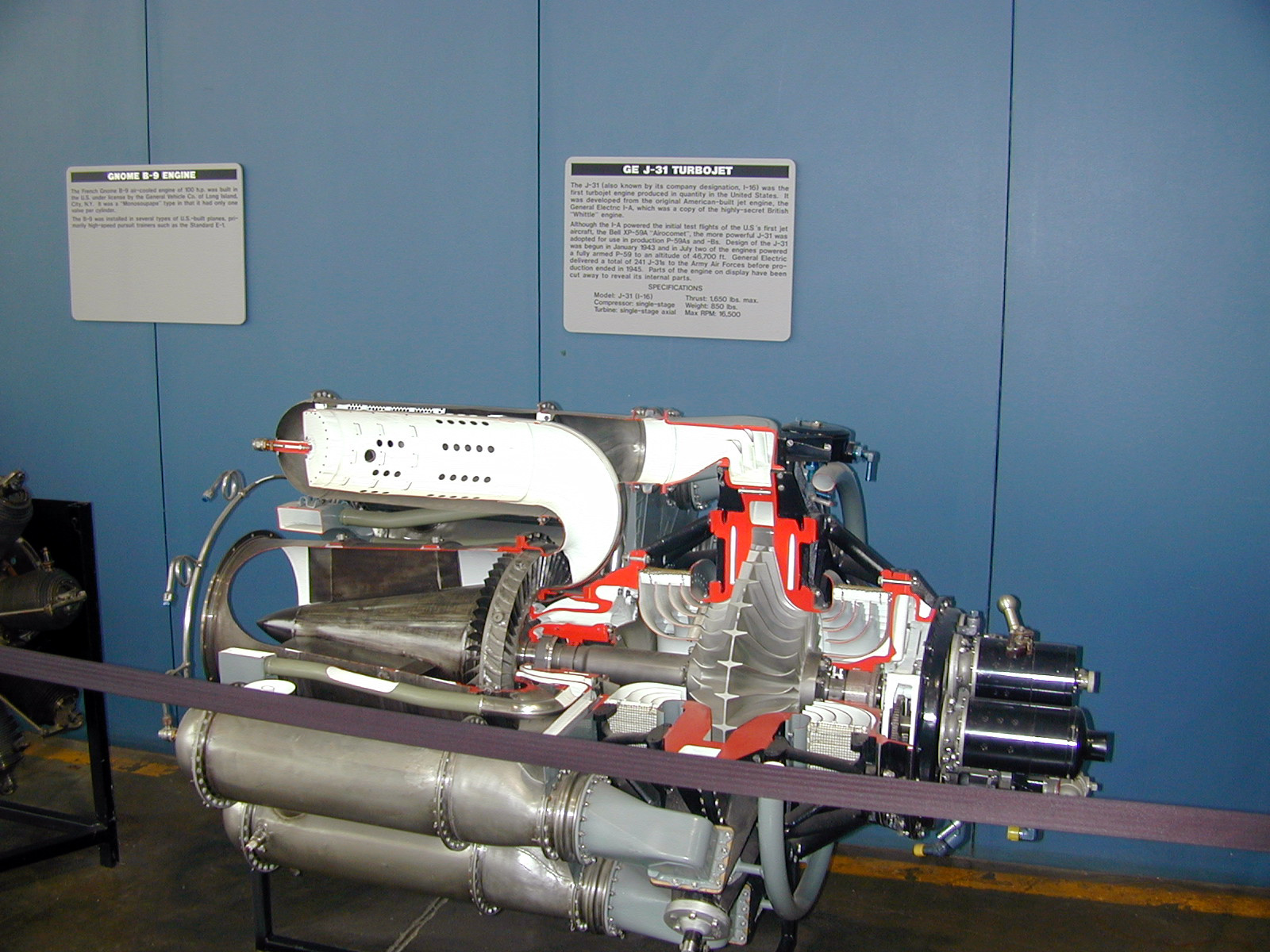
A cutaway General Electric J31 (I-16) turbojet engine based on the W.1/W.2B

Whittle wanted to improve the efficiency of the jet engine at lower speeds. According to Whittle, "I wanted to 'gear down the jet', ie to convert a low-mass high-velocity jet into a high-mass low-velocity jet. The obvious way to do this was to use an additional turbine to extract energy from the jet and use this energy to drive a low-pressure compressor or fan capable of 'breathing' far more air than the jet engine itself and forcing this additional air rearwards as a 'cold jet'. The complete system is known as a 'turbofan'." The first embodiment was referred to as a No 1 Thrust Augmentor, which consisted of an "aft fan", or additional turbine, in the exhaust of the main engine. In 1942, No 2 Augmentor, a conventional two-stage system with the fan blades external to the turbine blades, was used by GE in the Convair 990 Coronado. A No 3 Augmentor, known as the "tip turbine", had the turbine blades outside the fan. A No 4 Augmentor, in combination with the W2/700, included an afterburner and was the design powerplant for the Miles M.52 project. According to Whittle, "The first attempt at the turbofan proper, ie having the fan ahead of and supercharging the core engine, was the LR1 intended as the power plant of a four-engined bomber for operations in the Pacific. The mass flow through the fan of the LR1 was to have been 3–4 times that through the core engine, ie the 'bypass ratio' was 2–3." Filed in March 1936, Whittle's main turbofan patent 471368, expired in 1962.

Whittle's work had caused a minor revolution within the British engine manufacturing industry and, even before the E.28/39 flew, most companies had set up their own research efforts. In 1939, Metropolitan-Vickers set up a project to develop an axial-flow design as a turboprop but later re-engineered the design as a pure jet known as the Metrovick F.2. Rolls-Royce had already copied the W.1 to produce the low-rated WR.1 but later stopped work on this project after taking over Rover's efforts. In 1941, de Havilland started a jet fighter project, the Spider Crab – later called Vampire – along with their own engine to power it, Frank Halford's Goblin (Halford H.1). Armstrong Siddeley also developed a more complex axial-flow design with an engineer called Heppner, the ASX but reversed Vickers' thinking and later modified it into a turboprop instead, the Python. The Bristol Aeroplane Company proposed to combine jet and piston engines but dropped the idea and concentrated on propeller turbines instead.

=== Nationalisation ===
During a demonstration of the E.28/39 to Winston Churchill in April 1943, Whittle proposed to Stafford Cripps, Minister of Aircraft Production, that all jet development be nationalised. He pointed out that the company had been funded by private investors who helped develop the engine successfully, only to see production contracts go to other companies. Nationalisation was the only way to repay those debts and ensure a fair deal for everyone, and he was willing to surrender his shares in Power Jets to make this happen. In October, Cripps told Whittle that he decided a better solution would be to nationalise Power Jets only. Whittle believed that he had triggered this decision, but Cripps had already been considering how best to maintain a successful jet programme and act responsibly regarding the state's substantial financial investment, while at the same time wanting to establish a research centre that could use Power Jets' talents, and had come to the conclusion that national interests demanded the setting up of a Government-owned establishment. Within the MAP there was a feeling that Power Jets was effectively a research unit funded by the Treasury and that management within the company was non-existent, the latter was also expressed by workers at Power Jets. (Note: Whyte had resigned as Chairman and Managing Director in July 1941) On 1 December Cripps advised Power Jets' directors that the Treasury would not pay more than £100,000 for the company.

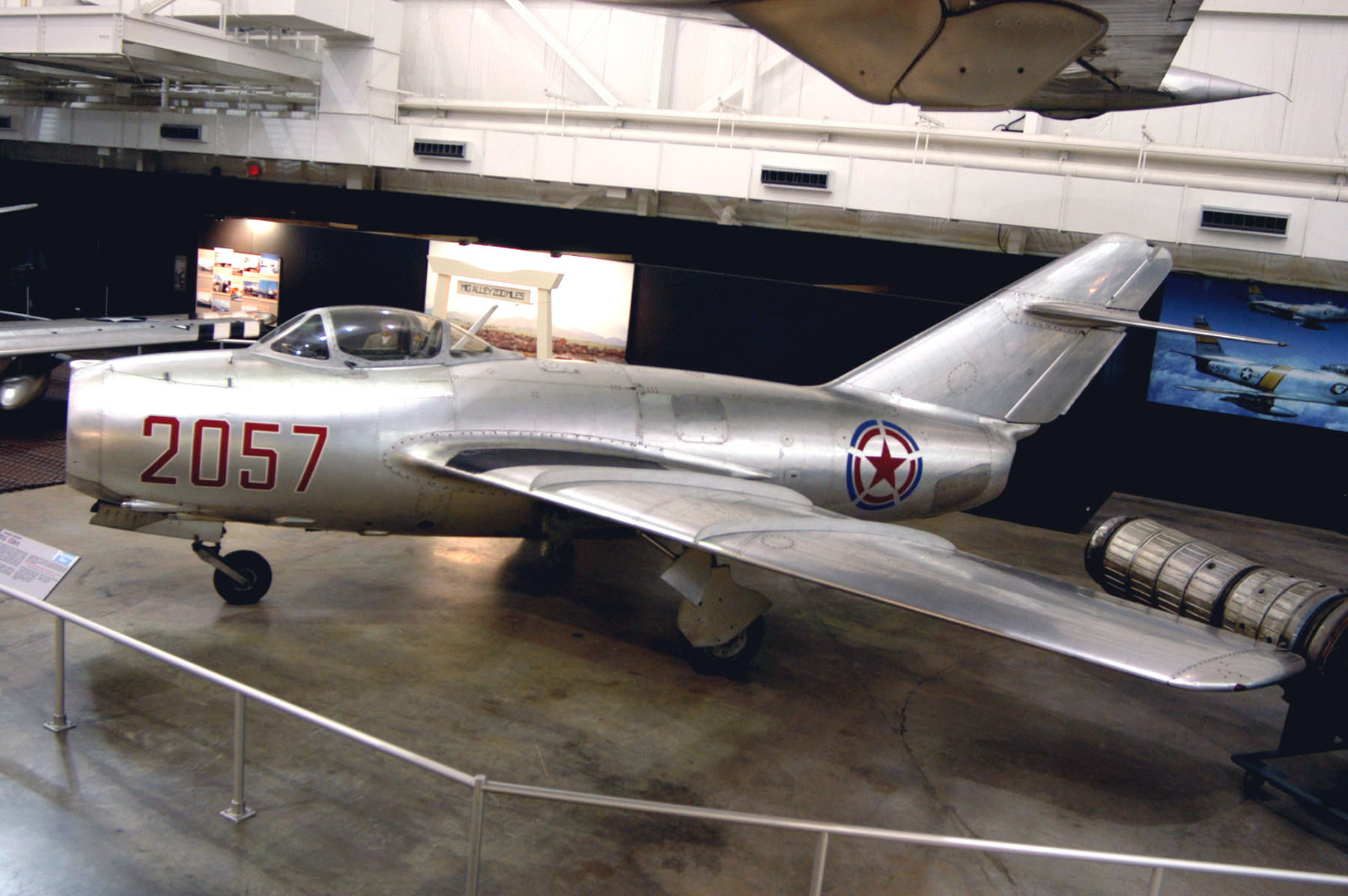
No Kum-sok's MiG-15 on display at the National Museum of the United States Air Force.

In January 1944 Whittle was appointed a Commander of the Order of the British Empire in the New Year Honours. By this time he was a group captain, having been promoted from wing commander in July 1943. Later that month after further negotiations the Ministry made another offer of £135,500 for Power Jets, which was reluctantly accepted after the Ministry refused arbitration on the matter. Since Whittle had already offered to surrender his shares he would receive nothing at all, while Williams and Tinling each received almost £46,800 for their stock, and investors of cash or services had a threefold return on their original investment. Whittle met with Cripps to object personally to the nationalisation efforts and how they were being handled, but to no avail. The final terms were agreed on 28 March, and Power Jets officially became Power Jets (Research and Development) Ltd, with Roxbee Cox as chairman, Constant of RAE Head of Engineering Division, and Whittle as Chief Technical Advisor. (Note: The board of directors included Sir William Stanier, Harry Ricardo, and Edwin Plowden) On 5 April 1944, the Ministry sent Whittle an award of only £10,000 for his shares.

Whittle and other Power Jets staff still held the view that they would be the sole designers of jet engines; they would build prototypes and industry would actually produce them. This view was in conflict with that of the engine companies, which in engine design had already achieved competence similar or superior to that of Power Jets. The engine companies stated they would not work with Power Jets if Power Jets were the sole designers. The government scientists from RAE who had been moved to Power Jets were against it also and within MAP there was a feeling that Power Jets was publicly financed but not under public administration. From the end of March, Whittle spent six months in hospital recovering from nervous exhaustion; he resigned from Power Jets (R and D) Ltd in January 1946. In July the company was merged with the gas turbine division of the RAE to form the National Gas Turbine Establishment (NGTE) at Farnborough. Sixteen Power Jets engineers, following Whittle's example, also resigned. The Rolls-Royce Nene (designed by Hooker, Lombard, Pearson and Morley) would be licensed and made in two different countries: in the United States as the Pratt & Whitney J42 jet engine, later incorporated into the Grumman F9F Panther and in the USSR Soviet as the Klimov VK-1 jet engine, later incorporated into the MiG-15; the Panther vs the MiG-15 would meet in air battles during the Korean war.

== After the war ==
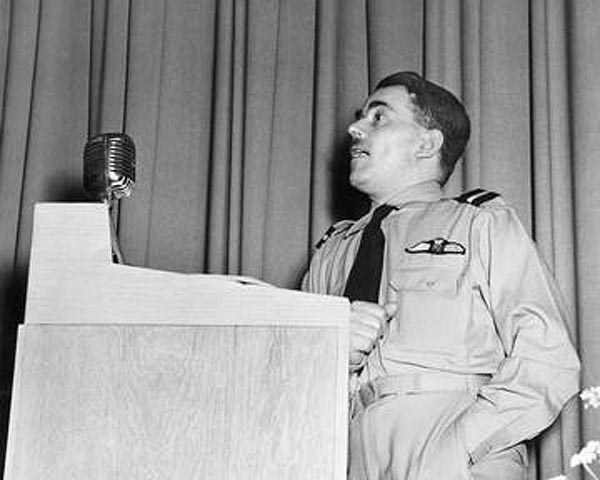
Frank Whittle speaking to employees of the Flight Propulsion Research Laboratory (Now known as the NASA Glenn Research Center), USA, in 1946

In 1946, Whittle accepted a post as Technical Advisor on Engine Design and Production to Controller of Supplies (Air); was made a Commander of the US Legion of Merit; and was appointed a Companion of the Order of the Bath in 1947. During May 1948 Whittle received an ex-gratia award of £100,000 from the Royal Commission on Awards to Inventors in recognition of his work on the jet engine, and two months later he was made a Knight Commander of the Order of the British Empire. In comparison by the end of 1947 as well as having reimbursed jet engine development costs of £12 million the British government had purchased an estimated £8.5 million worth of jet engines from de Havilland and Rolls-Royce. In the 1945-46 period foreign governments had purchased approximately £1 million of jet engines from de Havilland and Rolls-Royce and in 1947 £6 million. As a result by the end of 1947 the British Treasury was receiving £300,000 a year in commissions from the 5% that they received from de Havilland and Rolls-Royce on their overseas sales of jet engines in exchange for allowing them use of the Whittle’s patents that they had obtained after taking over Power Jets.

During a lecture tour in the US, Whittle again broke down and retired from the RAF on medical grounds on 26 August 1948, leaving with the rank of air commodore. He joined BOAC as a technical advisor on aircraft gas turbines and travelled extensively over the next few years, viewing jet engine developments in the United States, Canada, Africa, Asia and the Middle East. He left BOAC in 1952 and spent the next year working on a biography, Jet: The Story of a Pioneer. He was awarded the Royal Society of Arts' Albert Medal that year.

Returning to work in 1953, he accepted a position as a Mechanical Engineering Specialist with Shell, where he developed a new type of self-powered drill driven by a turbine running on the lubricating mud that is pumped into the borehole during drilling. Normally, a well is drilled by attaching rigid sections of pipe together and powering the cutting head by spinning the pipe from the surface, but Whittle's design removed the need for a strong mechanical connection between the drill and the head frame, allowing for much lighter piping to be used. He gave the Royal Institution Christmas Lectures in 1954 on The Story of Petroleum.

Turbine drilling is best used for drilling hard rocks at high-bit RPM with diamond-impregnated bits and can be used with an angled drive shaft for directional drilling and horizontal drilling. It competes, though, with Moyno motors and increasingly with rotary steerable systems and is again out of favour.

Whittle left Shell in 1957 to work for Bristol Aero Engines, who picked up the project in 1961, setting up "Bristol Siddeley Whittle Tools" to further develop the concept. In 1966 Rolls-Royce purchased Bristol Siddeley, but the financial pressures and eventual bankruptcy because of cost overruns of the RB211 project led to the slow wind-down and eventual disappearance of Whittle's "turbo-drill". The concept eventually re-appeared in the West in the late 1980s, imported from Russian designs. (Russia needed the technology because it lacked high strength drill pipe.)

As part of his socialist ideals, he proposed that Power Jets be nationalised, in part because he saw that private companies would profit from the technology freely given during the war. By 1964, he had deserted his previously socialist beliefs, going so far as to launch a fierce attack on the Labour candidate in Smethwick.

In 1960, he was awarded an honorary degree, doctor techn. honoris causa, at the Norwegian Institute of Technology, later part of Norwegian University of Science and Technology.

In 1967, he was awarded an honorary degree (Doctor of Science) by the University of Bath. That year, he was inducted into the International Air & Space Hall of Fame.

In 1987, he was awarded an honorary degree (Doctor of Technology) by Loughborough University.

In 2017, he was inducted into the National Aviation Hall of Fame in Dayton, Ohio.

== Later life ==
Whittle received the Tony Jannus Award in 1969 for his distinguished contributions to commercial aviation.

In 1976, his marriage to Dorothy was dissolved and he married American Hazel S. Hall. He emigrated to the US and the following year accepted the position of NAVAIR Research Professor at the United States Naval Academy (Annapolis, Maryland). His research concentrated on the boundary layer before his professorship became part-time from 1978 to 1979. The part-time post enabled him to write a textbook entitled Gas turbine aero-thermodynamics: with special reference to aircraft propulsion, published in 1981.

Having first met Hans von Ohain in 1966, Whittle again met him at Wright-Patterson Air Force Base in 1978 while von Ohain was working there as the Aero Propulsion Laboratory's Chief Scientist. Initially upset because he had believed von Ohain's engine had been developed after seeing Whittle's patent, he eventually became convinced that von Ohain's work was, in fact, independent. The two became good friends and often toured the US giving talks together.

In a conversation with Whittle after the war, von Ohain stated: "If you had been given the money you would have been six years ahead of us. If Hitler or Goering had heard that there is a man in England who flies 500 mph in a small experimental plane and that it is coming into development, it is likely that World War II would not have come into being."

In 1986, Whittle was appointed a member of the Order of Merit (Commonwealth). He was made a fellow of the Royal Society, and of the Royal Aeronautical Society, and in 1991 he and von Ohain were awarded the Charles Stark Draper Prize for their work on turbojet engines.

Whittle became an atheist by degrees.

Whittle died of lung cancer on 9 August 1996, at his home in Columbia, Maryland. He was cremated in America. Advised of Whittle’s death by the British Embassy in Washington, British Airways ensured that its Boeing 777-236 (registration G-ZZZA) named Sir Frank Whittle could be scheduled to fly his ashes back to the United Kingdom. There was consideration to interring his ashes in the Air Force Chapel in Westminster Abbey but as this was not possible St Michael's Church at RAF Cranwell was after some delay selected as his final internment spot. To convey his ashes there the RAF arranged to borrow two vintage aircraft scheduled to perform at the 1998 Farnborough Air Show. This allowed a Gloster Meteor NF11, serial number WM167 (registration G-LOSM) piloted by a retired Air Marshall to convey his ashes from Bournemouth to RAF Cranwell. This aircraft was accompanied by a de Havilland Vampire T55 flown by his son, Ian Whittle. A memorial service was held at Westminster Abbey on 16 November 1996 with the principal eulogy given by the Sir Michael Graydon, Chief of the Air Staff.

Hazel Whittle died on 30 July 2007 aged 91.

== Styles and promotions ==
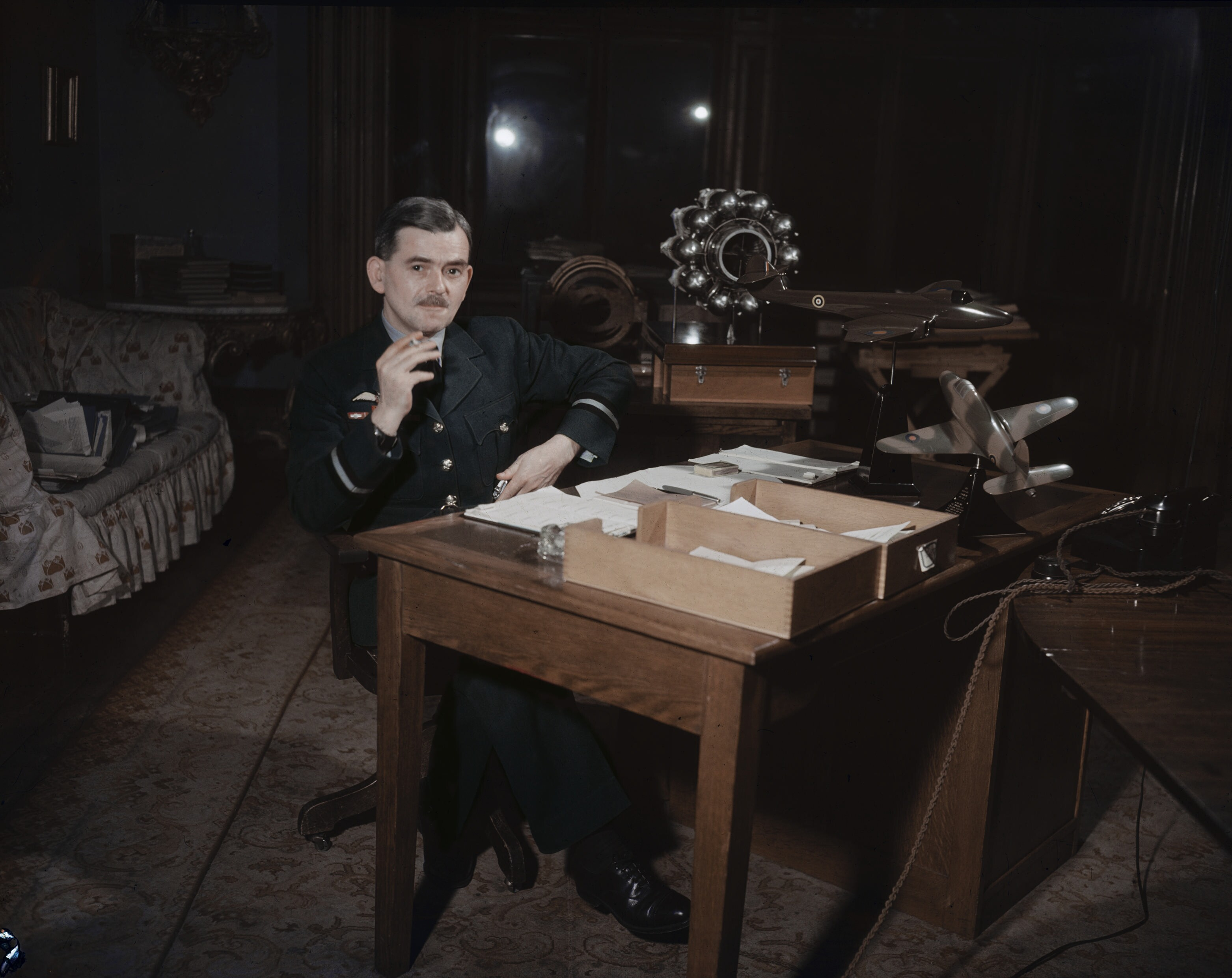
Air Commodore Frank Whittle at his desk

- 1907–1923: Frank Whittle
- 1923–1926: Apprentice Frank Whittle
- 1926–1928: Officer Cadet Frank Whittle
- 1928–1930: Pilot Officer Frank Whittle
- 1930–1934: Flying Officer Frank Whittle
- 1934–1938: Flight Lieutenant Frank Whittle
- 1938–1940: Squadron Leader Frank Whittle
- 1940–1941: Squadron Leader (Temp. Wing Commander) Frank Whittle
- 1941–1943: Wing Commander Frank Whittle
- 1943–1944: Wing Commander (Temp. Group Captain) Frank Whittle
- 1944–1946: Group Captain (Actg. Air Commodore) Frank Whittle, CBE
- 1946–1947: Group Captain (Temp. Air Commodore) Frank Whittle, CBE
- 1947–1948: Group Captain (Temp. Air Commodore) Frank Whittle, CB, CBE
- 1948–1986: Air Commodore Sir Frank Whittle, KBE, CB
- 1986–1996: Air Commodore Sir Frank Whittle, OM, KBE, CB, FRS, FRAeS

== Memorials ==
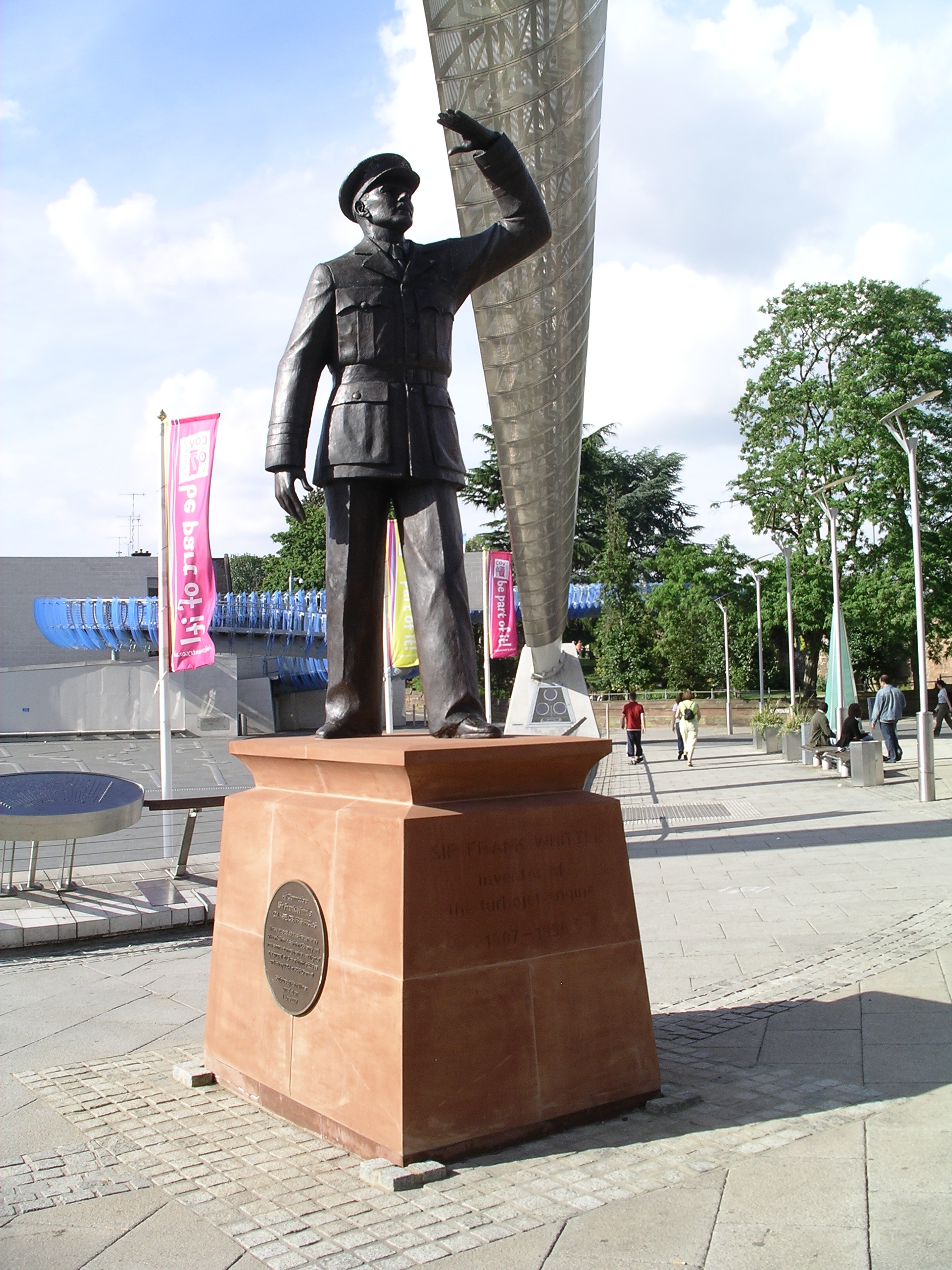
Statue of Sir Frank Whittle under the Whittle Arches, Coventry

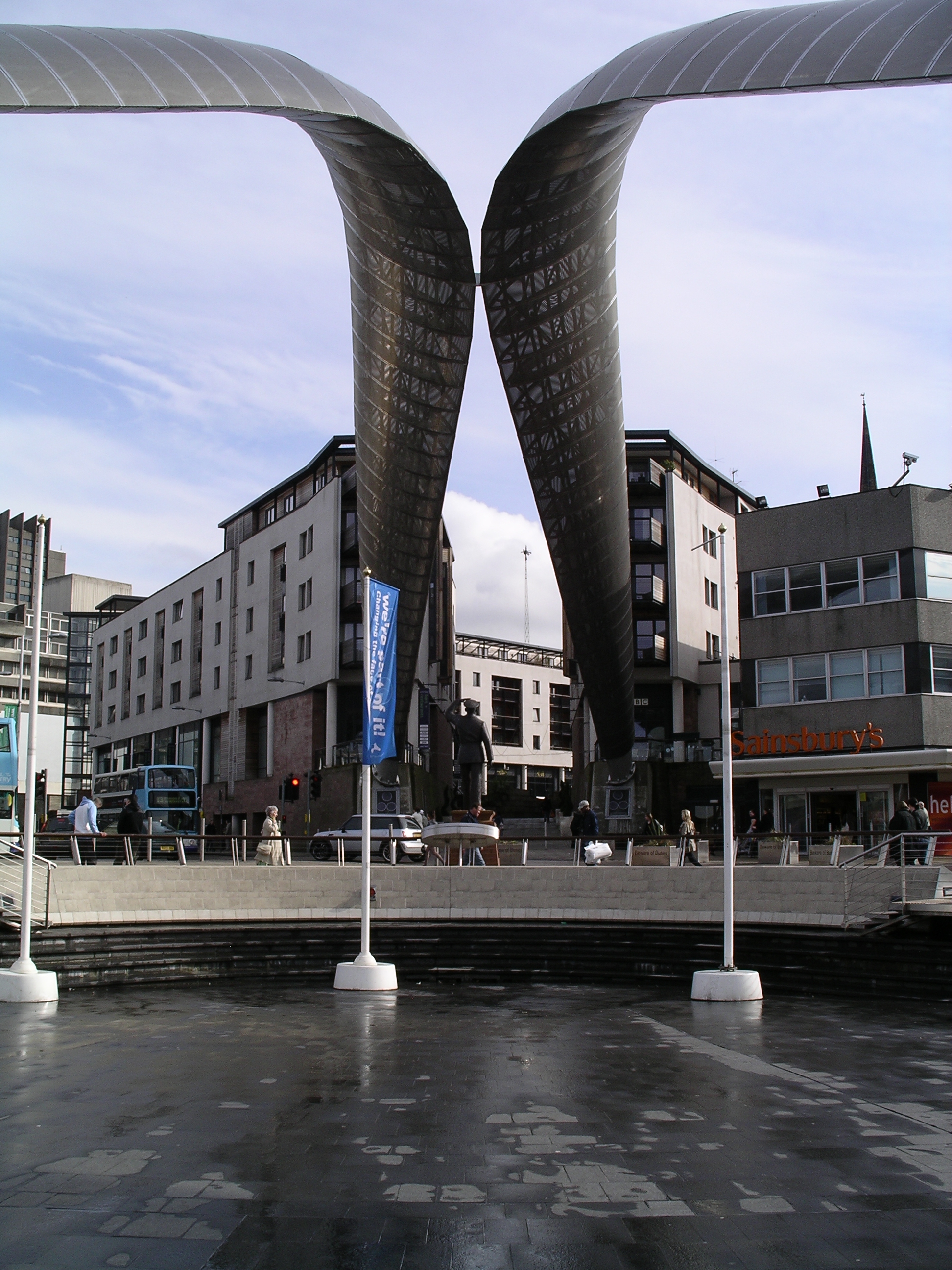
Whittle Arches and statue, Coventry

=== Coventry, England ===
- The "Whittle Arch" is a large double wing-like structure situated outside the Coventry Transport Museum, Millennium Place, Coventry City Centre.
- A statue of Whittle by Faith Winter is situated under the Whittle Arch. It was unveiled on 1 June 2007 by his son, Ian Whittle, during a televised event. It shows Whittle at RAF Cranwell looking towards the sky observing the first test flight of a Whittle-powered Gloster E.28/39 on 15 May 1941.
- A school is named after Whittle in the Walsgrave suburb of Coventry. It was first called Frank Whittle Primary, then renamed in 1997 as Sir Frank Whittle Primary School. A jet engine replica sits in the reception area of the school, donated by Whittle himself during his life.
- A commemorative plaque marks the house in Newcombe Road, Earlsdon, Coventry, in which he was born and lived until age nine.
- On Hearsall Common, near Whittle's Coventry birthplace, a plaque commemorates where Whittle gained inspiration when he saw an aircraft land. It says "on this common Frank Whittle, jet pioneer, first felt the power of flight."
- Coventry University named a building after him.
- The main hangar at the Midland Air Museum is called The Sir Frank Whittle Jet Heritage Centre.
- Whittle house was one of the four "houses" at Finham Park School until they were renamed in 2008.

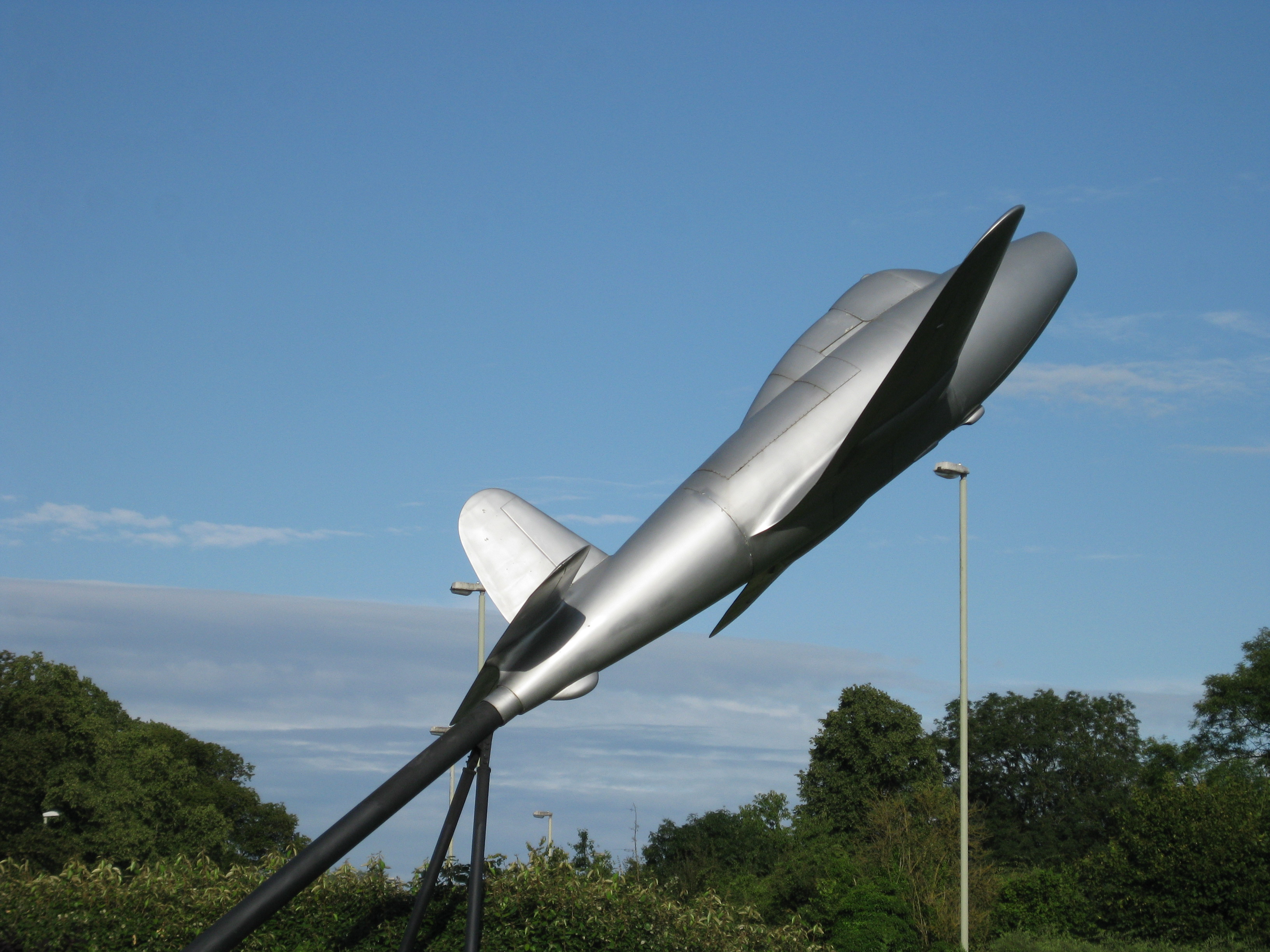
Whittle memorial at Lutterworth

=== Lutterworth, England ===
- The Sir Frank Whittle Studio School is a studio school that opened in 2015. It is situated alongside Lutterworth College, both of which make up The Lutterworth Academies Trust.
- Lutterworth Museum hold a very large unrivalled collection of original papers including the 1936 Patent, Power Jets Autograph book from 1945 and the Champagne bottle signed by everyone at a party at RAF Cranwell on the night of the first flight plus many more artefacts and displays. Also Lutterworth Museum gives talks and put on displays all over the country.
- A memorial has been erected in the middle of a roundabout outside Lutterworth and a bust of Frank Whittle has been erected in Lutterworth, where much of Whittle's development on the jet engine was carried out.
- There is a bust of Sir Frank Whittle near the war memorial on the corner of Church and George street.
- The Sir Frank Whittle Public House was opened in 2010 and situated on the Greenacres estate in Lutterworth. It was replaced with a Co-operative convenience store much to the dismay of the residents.
- Whittle Road in Lutterworth was named after Sir Frank Whittle.

=== Rugby, England ===
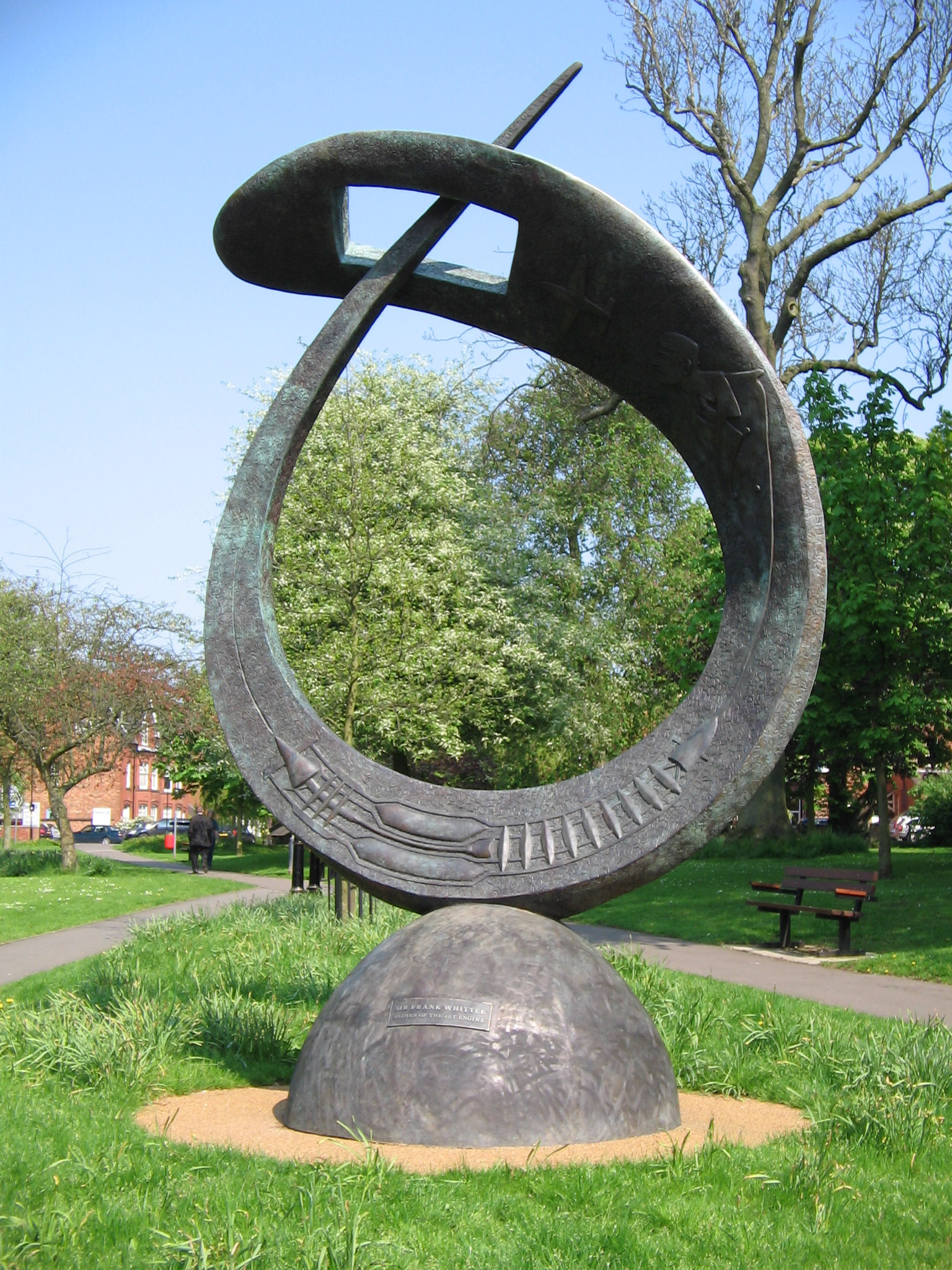
Whittle sculpture, Rugby

- In Rugby where Whittle produced his first prototype engines, a bronze sculpture named Frank Whittle – Father of the Jet Engine was installed at Chestnut Field near Rugby Town Hall in 2005. It was made by the sculptor Stephen Broadbent, and represents a propeller transformed into an internal turbine of a jet engine.

=== Elsewhere ===
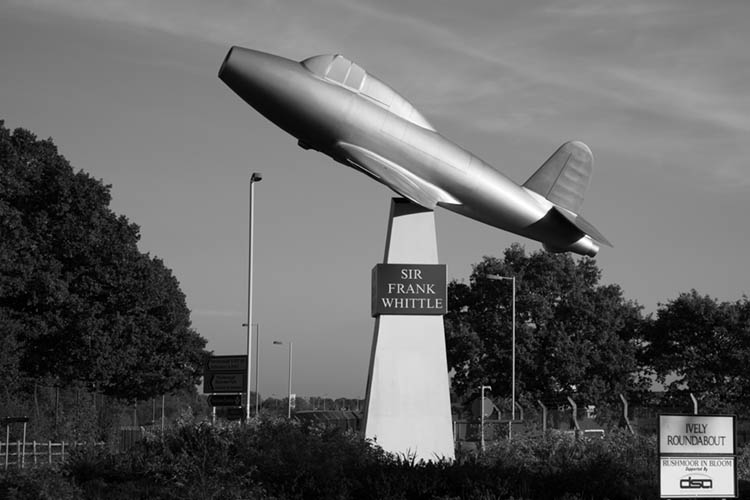
Sir Frank Whittle's memorial at Farnborough Aerodrome

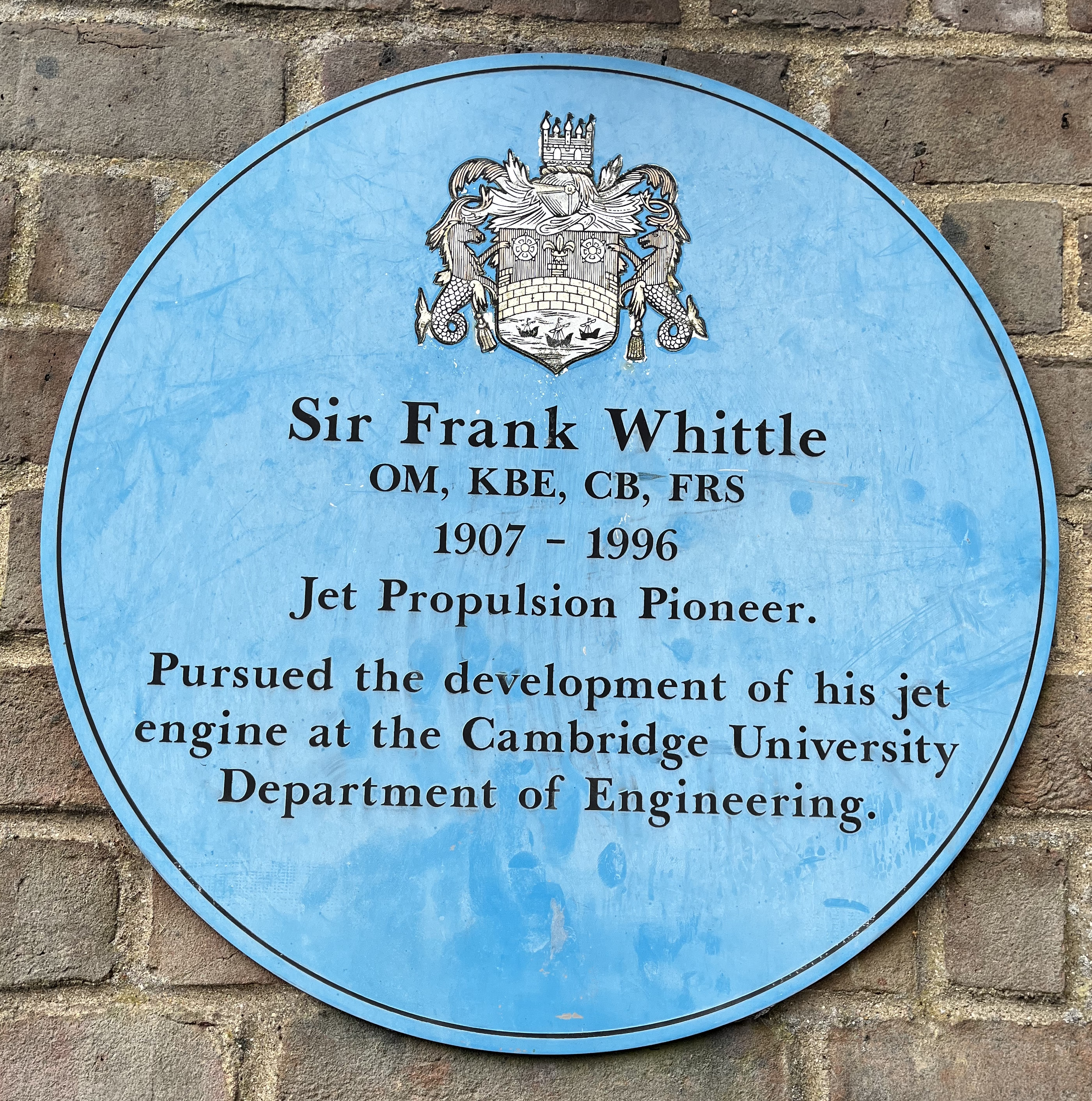
Frank Whittle - Blue plaque at Cambridge University Engineering Department, Trumpington St, Cambridge

- In 2015, Whittle's college at the University of Cambridge, Peterhouse, opened the Whittle Building on its grounds.
- The Department of Engineering, University of Cambridge, has a Whittle Laboratory.
- A full-scale model of the Gloster E28/39 Whittle has been erected just outside the northern boundary of Farnborough Airfield in Hampshire, UK.
- The Sir Frank Whittle Medal is awarded annually by the Royal Academy of Engineering to an engineer, normally resident in the UK, for outstanding and sustained achievement which has contributed to the well-being of the nation.
- Two roads in Derby are named Sir Frank Whittle Road and Sir Frank Whittle Way, as a tribute to his work at Rolls-Royce.
- The main office complex at the Rolls-Royce Bristol site has been named Whittle House.
- Whittle Parkway in Burnham is named after him.
- One of the main buildings at the Royal Air Force College Cranwell is called Whittle Hall. It houses the Officer & Aircrew Cadet Training Unit and the Air Power Studies Division of King's College London.
- A road in Cranford, on the site of the former Heston Aerodrome, is named Whittle Road.
- A road in Shaw, Oldham, is named Whittle Drive.
- A road in Rugby is named Whittle Close.
- Whittle Close in Clitheroe is named after him.
- Sir Frank Whittle Way, a new road in Blackpool Business park, Blackpool..
- The Whittle Gas field in the Southern North Sea operated by BP.
- The Whittle Inn near the Gloster Aircraft Company's former test runway in Hucclecote, Gloucestershire is named after Whittle; the nearby Tesco has a picture of a Gloster Meteor incorporated in part of its glass frontage.
- The bar/restaurant in Royal Mail's management college at Coton House, near Rugby, was named the Whittle Bar.
- A memorial stone was placed in the Royal Air Force Chapel in Westminster Abbey in his memory. The inscription on the stone reads: "Frank Whittle. Inventor & Pioneer of the Jet Engine. 1907–1996". The stone was carved by John Shaw.
- Sir Frank Whittle's national and international honours, medals, and awards (including the Order of Merit), are displayed in the Royal Academy of Engineering, London.
- The Frank Whittle house, with its own building existed at the now closed Fairham Comprehensive School Clifton, Nottingham.
- A building at Aero Engine Controls in Birmingham, UK has been named 'The Whittle Building' (1994).
- Whittle Hangar is one of the main Grade II listed legacy aircraft hangars at HMS Sultan. It contains elements of Leadership Training utilised by both the Marine Engineering Training Group and Royal Naval Air Engineering and Survival School. It was originally part of RAF Gosport, sited on the establishment's footprint from 1914 to 1945. For many years, Whittle Hangar was the site of establishment parade ceremonies for trainees during inclement weather.
- A plaque has been placed at the Port of Felixstowe to honour his link with the town (August 2010).
- A plaque commemorating Whittle has been placed inside the hall of Binswood Sixth Form College in Leamington Spa, formerly Leamington College for Boys.
- A plaque commemorating Whittle has been placed on Walland Hill, near Chagford in Devon, the house where he lived from 1962 to 1976
- One of the houses of Southam College is named after Whittle.
- One of the houses of Milverton County Primary School is named after Whittle.
- in 2023, King Charles III broke ground on the New Whittle Laboratory at the University of Cambridge.
- The Sir Frank Whittle Experience is a small social media group of New York Jets fans who celebrate his greatest achievement

== Bibliography ==
- Whittle, Frank (1953). Jet: The story of a pioneer. Frederick Muller Ltd. OCLC 2339557.
- Whittle, Frank (1981). Gas turbine aero-thermodynamics: with special reference to aircraft propulsion. Pergamon. ISBN 978-0-08-026718-0.

== See also ==
- Hans von Ohain
- Nathan C. Price
- Timeline of jet power
