= List of fellows of the Royal Society elected in 1945 =

This is a list of people elected Fellow of the Royal Society in 1945. This includes the first two female fellows: Kathleen Lonsdale and Marjory Stephenson.

== Fellows ==
- John Anderson, 1st Viscount Waverley
- Leonard Colebrook
- Sir William Scott Farren
- Norman Feather
- Sir John Henry Gaddum
- Sir Harry Godwin
- John Masson Gulland
- Hildebrand Wolfe Harvey
- Vincent Charles Illing
- Albert Edward Ingham
- Herbert Davenport Kay
- Wilfrid Bennett Lewis
- Dame Kathleen Yardley Lonsdale
- Prasanta Chandra Mahalanobis
- Sir Rudolf Ernst Peierls
- John Monteath Robertson
- Frederick Maurice Rowe
- Sir William Wright Smith
- Marjory Stephenson
- Sir Barnes Neville Wallis
- John Zachary Young
