= Cambridge Scientists' Anti-War Group =

The Cambridge Scientists' Anti-War Group (CSAWG) was a left wing pacifist group set up in 1932.

In 1937 responding to concerns about the use of poison gas bombs, the CSAWG organised an experiment in the Trinity College room of John Fremlin to determine the rate at which a gas might leak into a sealed room. The work was published by an editorial committee consisting of

- J. D. Bernal
- H. A. Harris
- A. F. W. Hughes
- Joseph Needham
- N. W. Pirie
- J. S. Turner
- D. H. Valentine
- E. B. Verney
- C. H. Waddington
- Arthur Walton
- W. A. Wooster

The book was given a hostile review in Nature by retired general Charles Foulkes. Jack Haldane also queried the rigour of the scientific methodology.

== Further notable members of CSAWG ==
- Eric Burhop
- John Fremlin
- Dorothy Needham
- Antoinette Pirie
- Frederick Sanger
- Richard Synge
- Marjory Stephenson
- Maurice Wilkins
