= Whittle Arch =

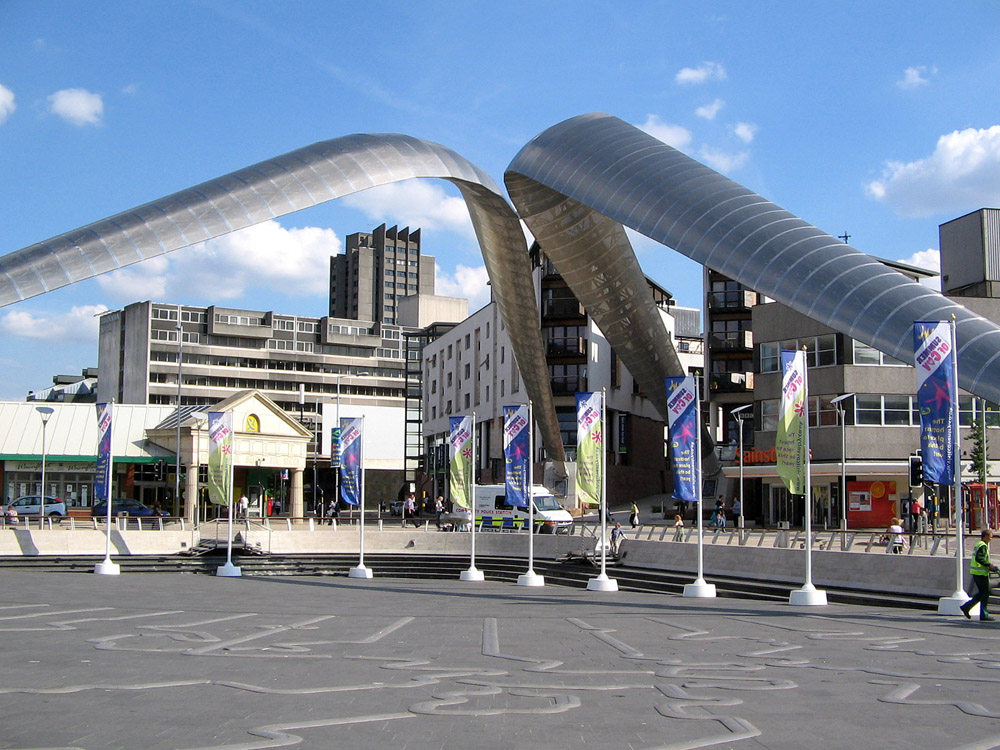
- The Whittle Arch in 2005
- Interactive map of Whittle Arch
- Location: Millennium Place, Coventry, England
- Coordinates: 52.41055°N 1.50863°W
- Designer: MacCormac Jamieson Prichard
- Type: Arch
- Material: Steel
- Width: 60m
- Height: 15m
- Completion date: 2003
- Dedicated to: Sir Frank Whittle

The Whittle Arch is a public art installation in Coventry, England. It is dedicated to Sir Frank Whittle, the inventor of the turbojet engine, who was born in Coventry. The arch was designed as part of Coventry's Phoenix Initiative regeneration project at the start of the 21st century.

== History ==
The Phoenix Initiative was instigated by Coventry City Council in the early 1990s, and the architectural firm MacCormac Jamieson Prichard won the contract in 1997 to masterplan the redevelopment. They designed the Whittle Arch as a transition from the "past" (St Mary's Priory and Cathedral) to the "future" (the Garden of International Friendship) on the pedestrian route through the project. It was constructed by Westbury Structures Ltd, then erected in 2003 by Butterley Construction.

In May 2020 the arch was cleaned by the council and new lights were installed to illuminate it at night. This was done as part of the council's effort to "work to make the city centre brighter and cleaner". The work was paid for with a £78,000 grant from the West Midlands Combined Authority.

== Design ==
The arch is in fact a pair of arches leaning together for support. It is constructed from steel aerofoil section tubular lattices covered in stainless steel mesh, allowing the lights inside to illuminate the structure. It has a 60-metre span over a bus gate in Millennium Place, outside the Coventry Transport Museum.
