= David H. Valentine =

British botanist and plant taxonomist

- Born: 16 February 1912; Salford
- Died: 10 April 1987 (aged 75); Manchester
- Education: University of Cambridge
- Scientific career
- Fields: botany, taxonomy
- Workplaces: Durham University, University of Manchester
- Author abbrev. (botany): Valentine

David Henriques Valentine (16 February 1912 – 10 April 1987) was a British botanist and plant taxonomist.

== Early career ==
Valentine was born in Higher Broughton, Salford, 16 February 1912, elder child of Emmanuel Henriques Valentine and his wife Dora Deborah Valentine née Besso. He was educated at Manchester Grammar School and then won a scholarship to St John's College, Cambridge, where he gained a first class degree in Natural Sciences.

His initial research interest was in plant physiology, leading to his 1937 PhD thesis "Induction phases in photosynthesis". JSTOR 4259429.; but the focus of his research changed to taxonomy, the relationships and distribution of flowering plants, and in 1936 he was appointed Curator of the Herbarium at the Botany School of the university. In 1938 he became a Fellow of St. John's.

He was a member of the Cambridge Scientists' Anti-War Group and was one of those who carried out experiments and, based on their outcome, published in 1937 a critical examination of the Air Raid Precaution schemes of the British Home Office. Their book was given a hostile review in Nature by retired general Charles Foulkes and Valentine was one of the signatories of a letter in reply.

When the War began he was drafted into the Ministry of Food to work on the dehydration of vegetables (cabbage, carrot and potato) intended for consumption by the armed forces. The success in this work was described in 1943 in the British House of Lords, which also reported on a Dehydration Mission to the British Empire in Africa, a mission in which Valentine took part. At the end of the war he was the editor of a fuller report of the dehydration work.

== Durham ==
In 1945 he was appointed as Head of the Department of Botany at the University of Durham, initially as Reader, then from 1950 as Professor. Starting from tiny beginnings he built up a flourishing department. One of his more inspired choices was the appointment as lecturer of the then unknown David Bellamy.

Valentine's research interests became well established in experimental taxonomy, especially of violets and the British primulas. He contributed to the knowledge of the interspecific relationships and evolution within these groups, with useful discussions of more general taxonomic principles. His department's undergraduate courses had a large content of taxonomy, field botany and ecology, with regular field excursions. A favourite destination for these was Upper Teesdale, an area which Valentine knew well. He was active in the movement to mitigate the effects of the creation of the Cow Green Reservoir there.

His interests were not confined to Northern England, however. He played a major rôle in the inception, development and subsequent successful conclusion of the Flora Europaea project, both as co-editor and co-author. In 1957 he had the opportunity to extend his research to the North American flora, spending a year as visiting professor at the Université de Montréal working with Áskell Löve and others.

== Manchester ==
In 1966 he was appointed as Harrison Professor of Botany in the University of Manchester. As well as research, teaching and administration he continued his vigorous participation in Flora Europaea. He organised an international conference of invited speakers on Taxonomy, Phytogeography and Evolution. He became a member of the Council of the Linnean Society of London (1968–1971 and 1976–1980), President of the International Organization of Plant Biosystematists (from 1974), and President of the Botanical Society of the British Isles (1977 to 1979). In 1974 he was awarded the Helsinki University Medal. He retired in 1979.

== Personal life ==
In March 1938 he married Joan Winifred Todd (twin sister of John W. Todd). They had five children. In retirement his health was not good and he died in Manchester on 10 April 1987.
