= John H. Fremlin =

English nuclear physicist (1913–1995)

John Heaver Fremlin (4 March 1913 – 9 March 1995) was an English nuclear physicist.

== Early life ==
Fremlin was born in Kingsbury, Middlesex. Celia Fremlin was his sister.

== Career ==
Fremlin was secretary of the Cambridge Scientists' Anti-War Group. Responding to concerns about the use of poison gas bombs, he hosted experiments by the group in his room in Trinity College to determine the rate at which a gas might leak into a sealed room. However Jack Haldane queried the rigour of his scientific methodology.

His papers are archived at the University of Birmingham.
