= Celia Fremlin =

English writer of mystery fiction (1914 – 2009)

Celia Margaret Fremlin (20 June 1914 – 16 June 2009) was an English writer of mystery fiction.

== Life ==
Celia was born in Kingsbury, Middlesex, England. She was the daughter of Heaver Fremlin and Margaret Addiscott. Her older brother, John H. Fremlin, later became a nuclear physicist.

Fremlin studied Classics at Somerville College, University of Oxford. From 1942 to 2000 she lived in Hampstead, London. In 1942 she married Elia Goller, with whom she had three children; he died in 1968. In 1985, Fremlin married Leslie Minchin, who died in 1999. Her many crime novels and stories helped modernize the sensation novel tradition by introducing criminal and (rarely) supernatural elements into domestic settings. Her 1958 novel The Hours Before Dawn won the Edgar Award in 1960.

Fremlin was involved in Mass-Observation during the war, and published War Factory with Tom Harrisson in 1943.

With Jeffrey Barnard, she was co-presenter of a BBC2 documentary, Night and Day, describing diurnal and nocturnal London, broadcast on 23 January 1987.

Fremlin was an advocate of assisted suicide and euthanasia. In a newspaper interview she admitted to assisting four people to die. In 1983 civil proceedings were brought against her as one of the five members of the EXIT Executive committee which had published A Guide to Self Deliverance, but the court refused to declare the booklet unlawful. She was also involved with the Progressive League.

Celia Fremlin greeting Julia Donaldson, Abbeyfield House, Bristol

== Writing ==
Lucy Lethbridge has written of Fremlin's work that "almost all her novels centring round the home as the harbour of a particularly horrible, intimate, terror".

Some of her novels have been reissued since her death. Notably, her 1959 book Uncle Paul was republished by Faber & Faber in the UK in June 2023.

== Death ==
She died on 16 June 2009 in Bournemouth.

== Bibliography ==
=== Manners and Society ===
- 1940 – The Seven Chars of Chelsea
- 1943 – War Factory (with Tom Harrisson)

=== Novels ===
- 1958 – The Hours Before Dawn; (Edgar Award for Best Novel, 1960)
- 1959 – Uncle Paul (Republished in the UK by Faber & Faber, June 2023)
- 1961 – Seven Lean Years (US: Wait for the Wedding)
- 1963 – The Trouble Makers
- 1964 – The Jealous One
- 1967 – Prisoner's Base
- 1969 – Possession
- 1972 – Appointment with Yesterday
- 1975 – The Long Shadow
- 1977 – The Spider-Orchid
- 1980 – With No Crying
- 1982 – The Parasite Person
- 1990 – Listening in the Dusk
- 1991 – Dangerous Thoughts
- 1993 – The Echoing Stones
- 1994 – King of the World

=== Collections ===
- 1970 – Don't Go to Sleep in the Dark
- 1974 – By Horror Haunted
- 1984 – A Lovely Day to Die
- 2019 - Ghostly Stories

=== Poetry ===
- 1996 – Duet in Verse (with Leslie Minchin)
