= Kathleen Lonsdale =

British crystallographer and activist (1903–1971)

Dame Kathleen Lonsdale DBE FRS MRIA
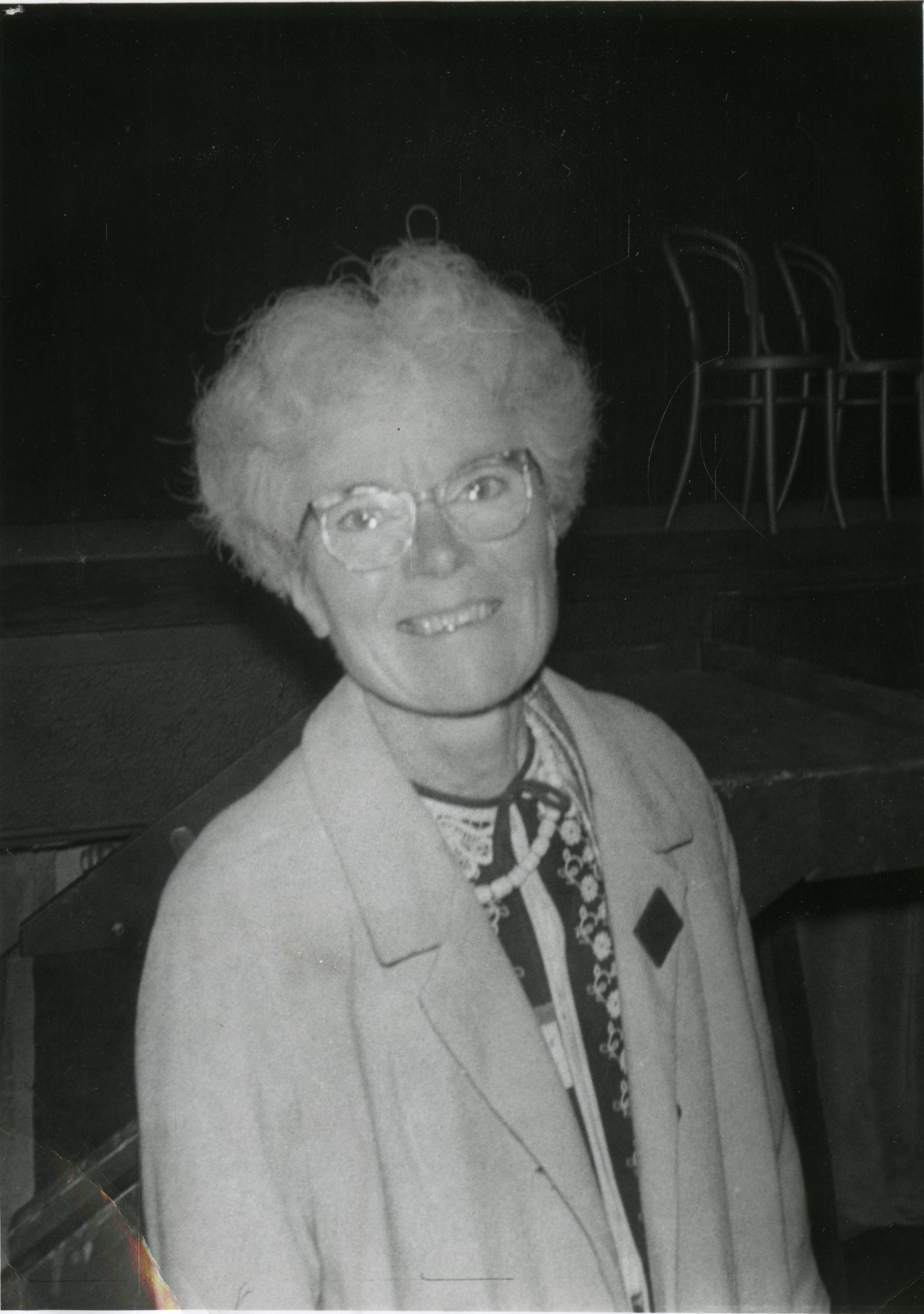
- Lonsdale in 1968
- Born: Kathleen Yardley; 28 January 1903; Newbridge, County Kildare, Ireland
- Died: 1 April 1971 (aged 68); London, England
- Education: Bedford College for Women; University College London
- Known for: X-ray crystallography
- Awards: Davy Medal (1957); Fellow of the Royal Society
- Scientific career
- Fields: Crystallographer
- Workplaces: University College London; Royal Institution; University of Leeds
- Doctoral advisor: William Henry Bragg

Dame Kathleen Lonsdale DBE FRS (née Yardley; 28 January 1903 – 1 April 1971) was an Irish crystallographer, pacifist, and prison reform activist. She proved, in 1929, that the benzene ring is flat by using X-ray diffraction methods to elucidate the structure of hexamethylbenzene. She was the first to use Fourier spectral methods while solving the structure of hexachlorobenzene in 1931. During her career she attained several firsts for female scientists, including being one of the first two women elected a Fellow of the Royal Society (FRS) in 1945 (along with Marjory Stephenson), first female professor at University College London, first woman president of the International Union of Crystallography, and first woman president of the British Association for the Advancement of Science.

== Early life and education ==
She was born Kathleen Yardley in Newbridge, County Kildare, Ireland. She was born to English-born Harry Frederick Yardley, the town postmaster, and Jessie Cameron, a Baptist of Scottish descent.

She was the youngest of ten children, four of whom died in infancy. During her time living in Newbridge she attended St. Patrick's National School, and her earliest memories were of the local Church of Ireland service and the Methodist Sunday school.

Lonsdale's father had issues with alcohol, which meant her family was often short on money. As the political unrest in Ireland became more severe, Kathleen's mother separated from her father and took the rest of the family to Seven Kings, Essex, England in 1908, when Lonsdale was five years old. The family's financial troubles meant the four older children left school early to support the family. For the same reason, her brother Fred was unable to take up an educational scholarship, though he later become one of the first wireless operators. Lonsdale's father subsequently moved to South Africa, returning occasionally for visits, and died when she was 20.

Lonsdale attended Downshall Elementary school from 1908 to 1914. She studied at Ilford County High School for Girls, then transferred to Ilford County High School for Boys to study mathematics and science, because the girls' school did not offer these subjects. In 1919 Lonsdale began studying at Bedford College for Women, graduating in 1922 with the highest score in physics that any student at London University had ever achieved. In 1924 Lonsdale completed a Master of Science (MSc) degree in physics from University College London. As a result of her success, William Henry Bragg (one of her examiners) offered her a research position.

== Career and research ==
In 1924 she joined the crystallography research team headed by Bragg at the Royal Institution. Following her marriage in 1927, she moved to the University of Leeds, but continued to correspond with Bragg.

While at Leeds between 1927 to 1932, she started a family but also set up X-ray equipment using a grant from the Royal Society. She balanced her work on the determination of space groups with the task of looking after her children. While at Leeds the Professor of Chemistry, Christopher Ingold suggested that she investigate the crystal structures of hexamethylbenzene and hexachlorobenzene. In both cases she showed the molecules to have a planar, hexagonal structure settling the long-standing dispute about the structure of benzene. Her husband Thomas Lonsdale was a textile chemist who supported his wife's research. He encouraged his wife to work from home and to go back to work when offered. He worked at the Silk Research Association in Leeds after they were married.

In 1934, Lonsdale returned to work with Bragg at the Royal Institution as a researcher. She was awarded a DSc from University of London in 1936 while at the Royal Institution. She was a pioneer in the use of X-rays to study crystals. Lonsdale was one of the first two women elected a Fellow of the Royal Society (FRS) in 1945 (the other was the biochemist Marjory Stephenson).

Lonsdale returned to University College London (UCL) in 1946 with the rank of reader. In 1949, she was appointed Professor of Chemistry and head of the Department of Crystallography at UCL. She was the first woman to be made a professor at UCL, an appointment she held until 1968 when she was named professor emeritus.

As a keen table tennis player, Lonsdale made use of ping pong balls to demonstrate molecular structures to her students. One such model—of the silicate group Si_{2}O_{5}—is in the Science Museum collection

During her later career, she became interested in stones and minerals produced in the human body e.g. kidney stones or gall stones. Some of her crystallographic models are in the collection of the Science Museum in London.

== Selected publications ==
- Lonsdale, Kathleen. (1936). Simplified Structure Factor and Electron Density Formulae for the 230 Space Groups of Mathematical Crystallography. London: Pub. for the Royal institution by G. Bell & sons, ltd.
- Lonsdale, Kathleen. (1947) "Divergent-beam X-ray photography of crystals". Philosophical Transactions of the Royal Society of London. Series A, Mathematical and Physical Sciences. 240 (817): 219–250. 27 March 1947. doi:10.1098/rsta.1947.0002. ISSN 0080-4614
- Lonsdale, Kathleen. 1948. Crystals and X-Rays. London: G. Bell.
- Lonsdale, Kathleen (15 March 1968). "Human Stones". Science. 159 (3820): 1199–1207. doi:10.1126/science.159.3820.1199.
- Lonsdale, Kathleen (1952) Quakers visit Russia, Edited by Kathleen Lonsdale : an account of a visit to the Soviet Union in July 1951 by seven British Quakers, 145 pages. Published by the East-West Relations Group of the Friends Peace Committee. (Other contributors: Margaret Ann Backhouse, B Leslie Metcalfe, Gerald Bailey, Paul S Cadbury, Mildred Creak, Frank Edmead).
- Lonsdale, Kathleen. (1953). Removing the Causes of War. (Swarthmore Lecture, 1953.).
- Lonsdale, Kathleen (1957). Is Peace Possible? [Harmondsworth, Eng.]: Penguin Books.
- Lonsdale, Dame Kathleen (1959). Forth in Thy Name: The Life and Work of Godfrey Mowatt. Wykeham Press.

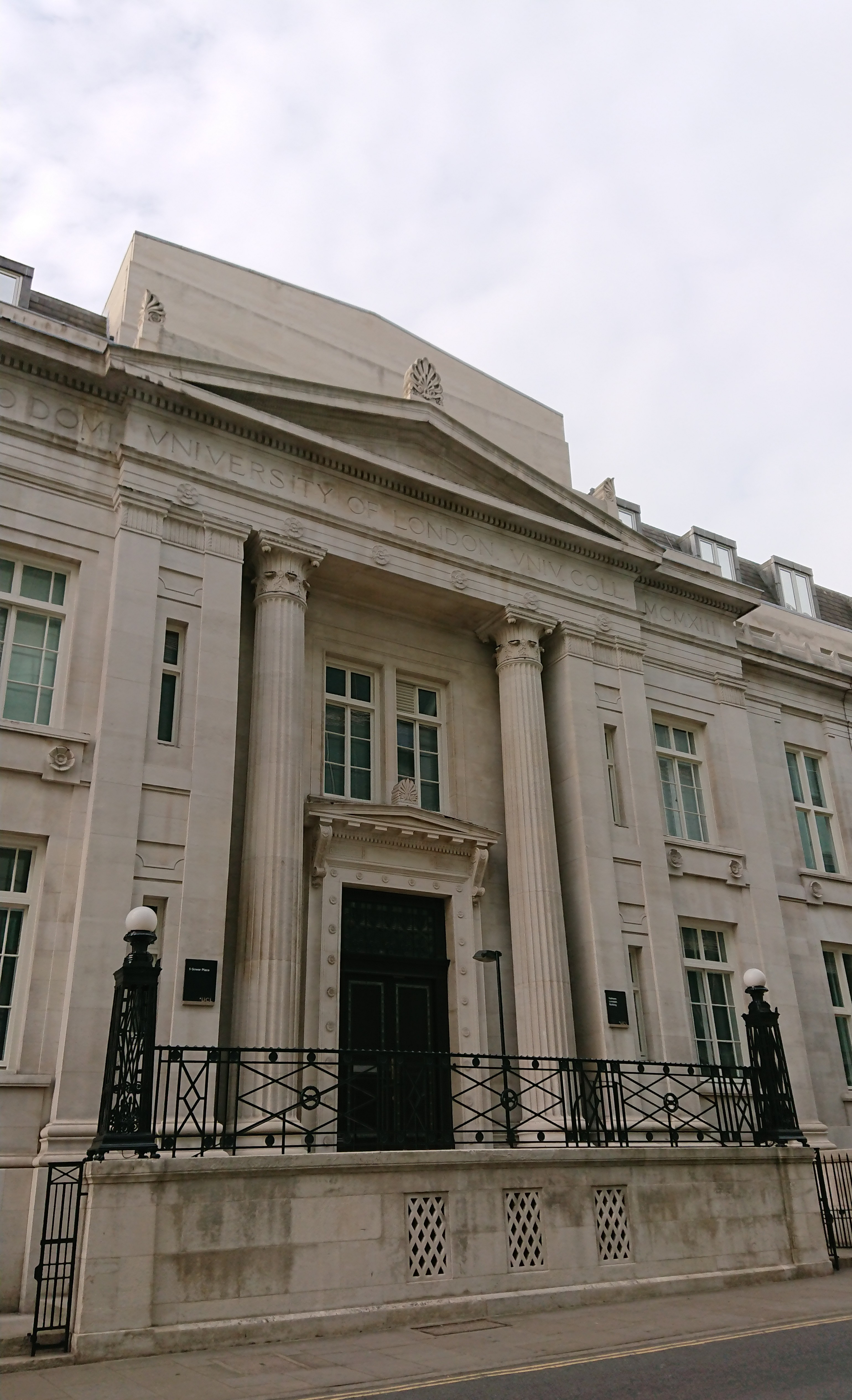
The Kathleen Lonsdale building at University College London

== Personal life ==
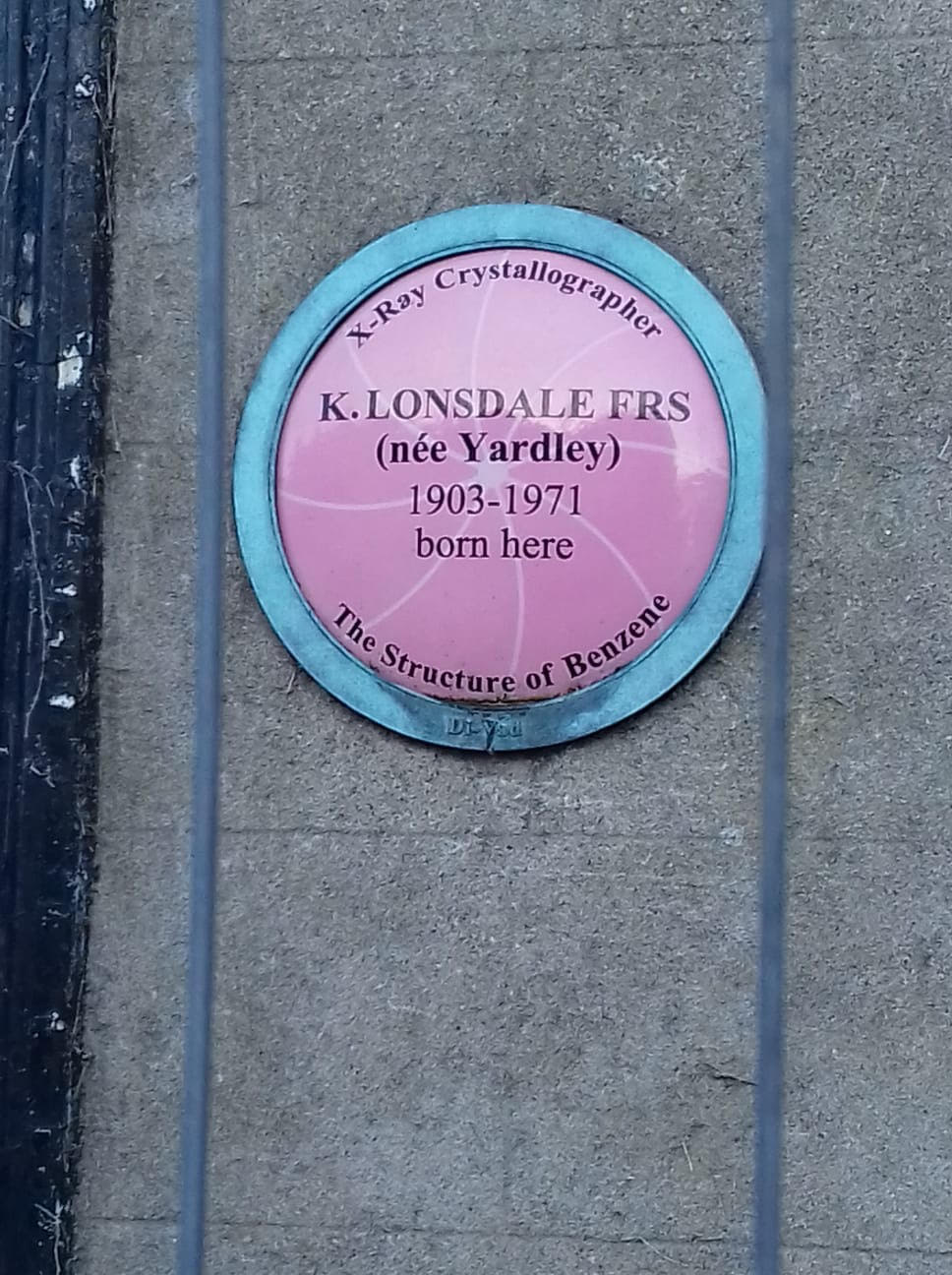
Lonsdale plaque, Newbridge

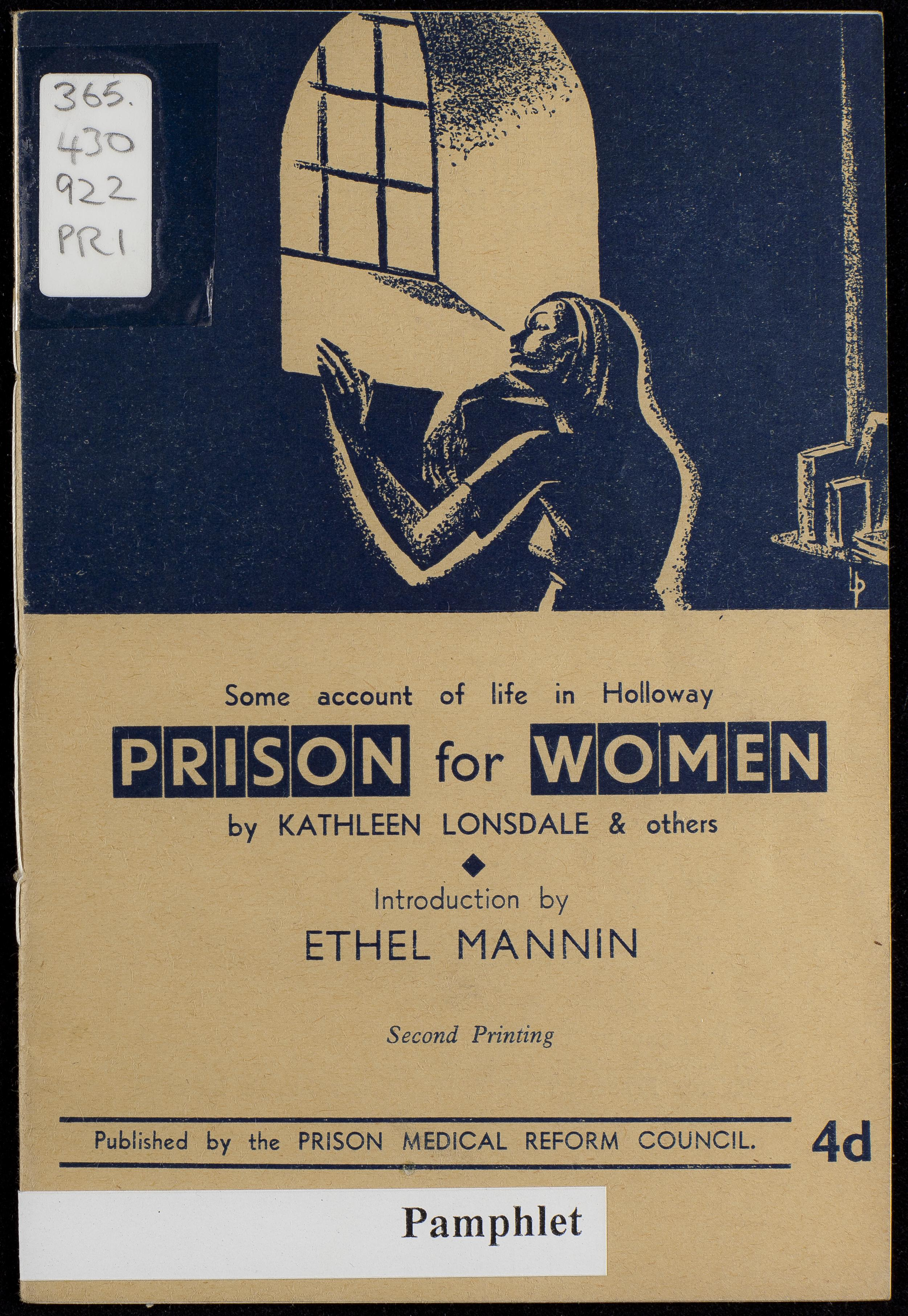
Pamphlet written by Kathleen Lonsdale on Prison Reform in 1943

After beginning her research career, in 1927 Yardley married Thomas Jackson Lonsdale. They had three children – Jane, Nancy, and Stephen. Stephen became a medical doctor and worked for several years in Nyasaland (now Malawi).

Lonsdale was a vegetarian and teetotaller.

=== Pacifism ===
Though she had been brought up in the Baptist denomination as a child, Kathleen Lonsdale became a Quaker in 1935, simultaneously with her husband. Already committed pacifists, both were attracted to Quakerism for this reason. She was a Sponsor of the Peace Pledge Union.

She served a month in Holloway prison during the Second World War because she refused to register for civil defence duties or to pay a fine for refusing to register. During this time she experienced a range of issues which would eventually result in Lonsdale becoming a prison reform activist and she joined the Howard League for Penal Reform.

What I was not prepared for was the general insanity of an administrative system in which lip service is paid to the idea of segregation and the ideal of reform, when in practice the opportunities for contamination and infection are innumerable, and those responsible for re-education practically nil.

In 1953, at the Yearly Meeting of the British Quakers, she delivered the keynote Swarthmore Lecture, under the title Removing the Causes of War. A self-identified Christian pacifist, she wrote about peaceful dialogue and was appointed the first secretary of Churches' Council of Healing by the Archbishop of Canterbury William Temple.

=== Death ===
Lonsdale died on 1 April 1971, aged 68, from an anaplastic cancer, possibly related to her exposure to x-rays.

== Legacy and honours ==
- In 1946 Kathleen Lonsdale was elected an Honorary Member of the Women's Engineering Society in recognition of her "brilliant and important work".
- 1956, she was made Dame Commander of the Order of the British Empire.
- 1966, she was elected as the first woman president of the International Union of Crystallography.
- 1967, active in encouraging young people to study science, she was elected as the first woman president of the British Association for the Advancement of Science.
- 1969, she was awarded an Honorary Degree (Doctor of Science) by the University of Bath.
- Lonsdaleite, an allotrope of carbon, was named in her honour; it is a rare harder form of diamond found in meteorites.
- Several universities have buildings named in her honour including the Chemistry Department building at University College London, at the University of Limerick, at Dublin City University, and at Maynooth University.
- She was a member of the Royal Irish Academy and the Royal Irish Academy Chemistry Prize for the best chemistry PhD thesis in Ireland has been named in her honour since 2000.
- A plaque was erected on Lonsdale's family home in Newbridge by the National Committee for Commemorative Plaques in Science and Technology in 2003, 100 years after her birth. The home, Charlotte House, was the post office at the time of her birth and is now the Newbridge Business Centre.
- On 1 April 2021, English Heritage unveiled a blue plaque at her childhood home in 19 Colenso Road, Seven Kings, London, where she lived from 1911 to 1927, aged 8–24.
- The Kathleen Lonsdale room at Friends House, London, UK is named after her.

== See also ==
- List of peace activists
