= Maxime Guillaume =

French inventor (1888–?)

In aerospace, Maxime Guillaume (born 1888) was an agricultural engineer who filed a French patent for a turbojet engine in 1921.

The first patent for using a gas turbine to power an aircraft was filed in 1921 by Guillaume (French patent no. 534,801; filed: 3 May 1921; issued: 13 January 1922). His engine was to be an axial-flow turbojet, but was never constructed, as it would have required considerable advances over the state of the art in compressors.

from Page 3 of Guillaume's patent
