= Marjory Stephenson =

British biochemist (1885–1948)

Marjory Stephenson MBE ARRC FRS
- Born: 24 January 1885; Burwell, Cambridgeshire, England
- Died: 12 December 1948 (aged 63); Cambridge, England
- Education: Newnham College, Cambridge
- Known for: Bacterial Metabolism (1930)
- Scientific career
- Fields: Biochemistry, microbiology
- Workplaces: University College London; University of Cambridge

Marjory Stephenson (24 January 1885 – 12 December 1948) was a British biochemist. In 1945, she was one of the first two women elected a Fellow of the Royal Society, the other being Kathleen Lonsdale.

She wrote Bacterial Metabolism (1930), which ran to three editions and was a standard textbook for generations of microbiologists. A founder of the Society for General Microbiology, she also served as its second president. In 1953, the Society established the Marjory Stephenson Memorial Lecture (now the Marjory Stephenson Prize Lecture) in her memory. This is the Society's principal prize, awarded biennially for an outstanding contribution of current importance in microbiology.

== Childhood and education ==
Stephenson grew up in Burwell, a village on the edge of The Fens in Cambridgeshire, between Newmarket and Cambridge. Her father Robert (1847–1929) was a farmer, surveyor and owner of a cement-manufacturing company; her mother was Sarah Rogers (1848–1925). Robert Stephenson was a prominent figure in the local community, appointed as a Justice of the Peace and then Deputy Lieutenant of Cambridgeshire; he was also a chairman of the County Council. He employed many local people in his cement works. Both of Stephenson's grandfathers, Robert Matthew Stephenson (1815–1870) and Samuel Rogers, were racehorse trainers in Newmarket, a major horse-racing centre. Samuel Rogers had been a jockey before becoming a trainer.

Stephenson was the youngest of the family by nine years. She was first inspired to take an interest in science by her governess Anna Jane Botwright. Stephenson later studied at the Berkhamsted School for Girls in Hertfordshire.

In 1903 she went to Newnham College, Cambridge. Stephenson read Natural Sciences, taking courses in chemistry, physiology and zoology for Part I of the Natural Sciences Tripos. At this time, women were still excluded from Cambridge University's chemistry and zoology laboratories; Newnham College had its own chemistry laboratory and women attended biology practicals in the Balfour Laboratory.

== Early career and First World war service ==
Stephenson originally intended to study medicine after Newnham, but her plans changed due to a lack of funds and she became a domestic science teacher, first at Gloucester County Training College and then at King's College of Household Science, London. In London she shared a flat with historian Myra Curtis, who was later Principal of Newnham College. As Stephenson did not find domestic science fulfilling, she was grateful when R. H. A. Plimmer, co-founder of the Biochemical Club (later Society), invited her to become a researcher in his laboratory at University College London. Here she investigated fat metabolism, and also taught nutrition. Her studies of the intestine focused on the enzyme lactase, necessary for digestion of milk, and showed that it was inhibited by glucose but not galactose. She also worked on the consequences in metabolism of experimental diabetes and the synthesis of palmitic acid esters. She was awarded a Beit Memorial Fellowship in 1913, but her work was interrupted by the First World War.

After joining the British Red Cross Society, Stephenson ran hospital kitchens in France; later she became a Voluntary Aid Detachment (VAD) commandant in Salonica (Thessaloniki). She was mentioned in despatches, and, in December 1918, was appointed Member of the Most Excellent Order of the British Empire (MBE). She also received an Associate Royal Red Cross (ARRC) in recognition of her service. As a result of her war-time experience, she became a pacifist and, later, was an active member of the Cambridge Scientists' Anti-War Group.

== Research at Cambridge ==
After the end of the war, Stephenson returned to Cambridge to carry out research and teach in the department of biochemistry. Under the leadership of Frederick Gowland Hopkins, a group of scientists became the centre of modern biochemical studies. Here Stephenson was encouraged to move from animal metabolism and so began research on bacteria and their metabolism. This was the start of work that developed so that she became one of the UK's most eminent bacterial chemists.

The department had an unusually high proportion of women amongst its researchers, at 15 per cent, but it was still very rare for a woman to be offered a University appointment. Stephenson was financed by her Beit Fellowship and later by the Medical Research Council. She was finally appointed a University lecturer in biochemistry in 1943. Meanwhile, she became an associate and later a fellow of her old College, Newnham. In 1936 the University awarded her a Doctorate of Science (DSc) degree for her research.

Stephenson's main area of research was bacterial metabolism. With Margaret Whetham and Juda Quastel, she developed the washed suspension technique, which had originated with Louis Pasteur, for extracting enzymes from bacteria. With Leonard Stickland, she was the first to isolate a bacterial enzyme from the cell in 1928, when they obtained lactic dehydrogenase from Escherichia coli. In the 1930s, she continued to work with Stickland and demonstrated that a particular enzyme, formate hydrogen lyase (EC 1.17.1.9), was present in cell extracts only when the bacteria had been grown in the presence of formate. This was one of the first examples of 'adaptive enzymes,' now understood as the rapid transcriptional activation of the gene encoding the formate hydrogenlyase when the activator, formate, is added to the culture. Later in the 1930s Stephenson worked with Ernest Gale on enzyme adaptation and amino acid metabolism, and with Arthur Trim on metabolic studies of nucleic acids.

Stephenson is most widely remembered for her seminal book, Bacterial Metabolism, which ran to three editions between 1930 and 1949. Last reprinted in 1966, it was the standard work on the subject for generations of microbiologists and biochemists.

== Royal Society membership ==
In 1902 Hertha Ayrton was the first woman to be proposed as a Fellow of the Royal Society but was rejected because the society's lawyers successfully argued that it was impossible for a woman to be a Fellow. The Sex Disqualification (Removal) Act 1919 and a Privy Council ruling on the legal status of women in 1929 rendered these arguments obsolete. But, it was not until 1943 when, spurred to action by a critical article in the Daily Worker by J.B.S. Haldane (Jack Haldane), the Royal Society considered accepting women as Fellows. Charles Harington nominated Stephenson and, after a ballot in which a large majority of Fellows voted to accept women, she was duly elected in 1945 together with Kathleen Lonsdale.

== Second World war service and post-war research ==
During the Second World War, Stephenson served on the Toxin Committee.

After the war the Rockefeller Foundation and the Medical Research Council funded a new laboratory at Cambridge (known as the "Bug Hut"), to which she moved in 1947. Stephenson was also influential in improving teaching of microbial biochemistry; she helped set up a special Part II Biochemistry (Microbial) in Cambridge in the same year.

Alexander Fleming, one of the founders of the Society for General Microbiology, tried to induce her to take the role of the Society's first President, but she declined; Stephenson was elected as its second president in 1947.

Also in 1947 she was finally recognised by the university for her many years of service; they appointed her as the first Reader in Chemical Microbiology, a permanent position. She died of cancer on 12 December 1948, a year after the university appointment.

Her biographer said of Stephenson: "She made her way in science by pioneering her own field, and her life was her work and her friends." She also found time to do gardening and to travel, visiting the United States and the USSR in the 1930s.

== Legacy and honours ==
- Appointed Member of the Most Excellent Order of the British Empire (MBE) and Associate Royal Red Cross (ARRC) for her service during World War I
- Marjory Stephenson biennial memorial lecture established by the Society for General Microbiology in her honour in 1953
