= William Scott Farren =

British aeronautical engineer

Sir William Scott Farren CB MBE FRS

Technical Director, Avro
- In office 1947–1961

Director, Royal Aircraft Establishment
- In office July 1941 – 1946

Personal details
- Born: 3 April 1892
- Died: 3 July 1970 (aged 78)

Sir William Scott Farren (3 April 1892 – 3 July 1970) was a pioneer in flight, a British aeronautical engineer, the Director of the Farnborough establishment during the Second World War and the former technical director of the Manchester-based aircraft company Avro during the 1950s.

== Early life ==
He attended The Perse School in Cambridge, then attended Trinity College, Cambridge from October 1911, studying Mechanical Sciences.

== Career ==
=== World War One ===
After graduating with a 1st class honours degree, Farren joined a new team being assembled at the new Farnborough Factory and became Head of Aerodynamics. In 1916 along with two scientist friends he learnt to fly. During 1917 he designed and built a flying boat, the CE1, for which he was also the test pilot in January 1918, making 27 flights from Southampton Water. Two prototypes were produced but, as the war ended, the twin engined Felixstowe Flying Boat was favoured for production.

=== University of Cambridge ===
From 1920 to 1937 he was a lecturer in Engineering and Aeronautics at the University of Cambridge, under Sir Melvill Jones, being a Fellow of Trinity College, Cambridge. Whilst at Cambridge, he sat on the Aeronautical Research Committee.

=== Air Ministry ===
From 1937 to 1939 he was deputy Director of Research at the Air Ministry, and from 1939 to 1940 at the Minister of Aircraft Production, then from 1940 to 1941 he was Director of Technical Development; in this position he helped Avro to develop the Avro Lancaster, then known as the Avro 683 which was developed at the factory at Chadderton. The chief executive of MAP was Air Chief Marshal Sir Wilfrid Freeman, with his deputy Arthur Tedder, 1st Baron Tedder.

In July 1941 he was appointed as the first Director of the Farnborough Aeronautical Establishment where he led a massive expansion of the facility in support of the war effort. He was the only Director who regularly flew, making 91 flights in 1942 and at least 95 in 1945, despite being in his 50s by then.

=== Farren Mission ===
In 1945 Churchill personally appointed Farren to lead a team of scientists in what was commonly known as the Farren Mission - to discover the secrets of German aeronautical advances and interview their scientists. The chief test pilot in the team was a young pilot, Captain Eric "Winkle" Brown, who went on to hold the world record for the number of different types of plane he flew. This mission in 1945 was the precursor to Operation Surgeon, a British post-Second World War programme to exploit German aeronautics and deny German technical skills to the Soviet Union.

=== Avro ===
From 1947 to 1961 (until the company's demise) he was Technical Director of Avro. He was appointed to Avro immediately after the death of its Chief Designer Roy Chadwick, which had stunned the company's workforce. During this time he played a very significant role in bringing the Vulcan project to completion, the plane entering service in 1956. He retired in August 1961.

=== Comet ===
In 1954, Sir William was appointed as one of three assessors to investigate the causes of three de Havilland Comet disasters. The intensive Farnborough investigation discovered that metal fatigue was the cause of the accidents, in particular originating from the corner of a cut out in the airframe. A legacy of the team's efforts was that all future airliners were built with oval windows.

== Personal life ==
He was awarded the MBE in 1918. He was awarded the CB in the 1943 Birthday Honours. He became an FRS in 1945. He was knighted in the 1952 Birthday Honours. He married in August 1917 (with a daughter born in August 1919, who died in 1980 aged 61); his wife died on 28 February 1963. He then married Mildred Hooke OBE, the former headmistress from 1927 to 1955 of Bradford Girls' Grammar School in October 1963. He died in 1970 aged 78; he was ill for the last five years of his life. He lived west of Cambridge. He went sailing near his house at Burnham Overy in Norfolk.

== See also ==
- List of RAeS medal recipients
- The Papers of Sir William Scott Farren held at Churchill Archives Centre

Business positions
Preceded by Roy Chadwick	Technical Director of Avro; 1947 – August 1961	Succeeded by Company defunct
Professional and academic associations
Preceded by	President of the Royal Aeronautical Society; 1953-1954	Succeeded by Sir Sydney Camm
