= List of UK Album Downloads Chart number ones of the 2000s =

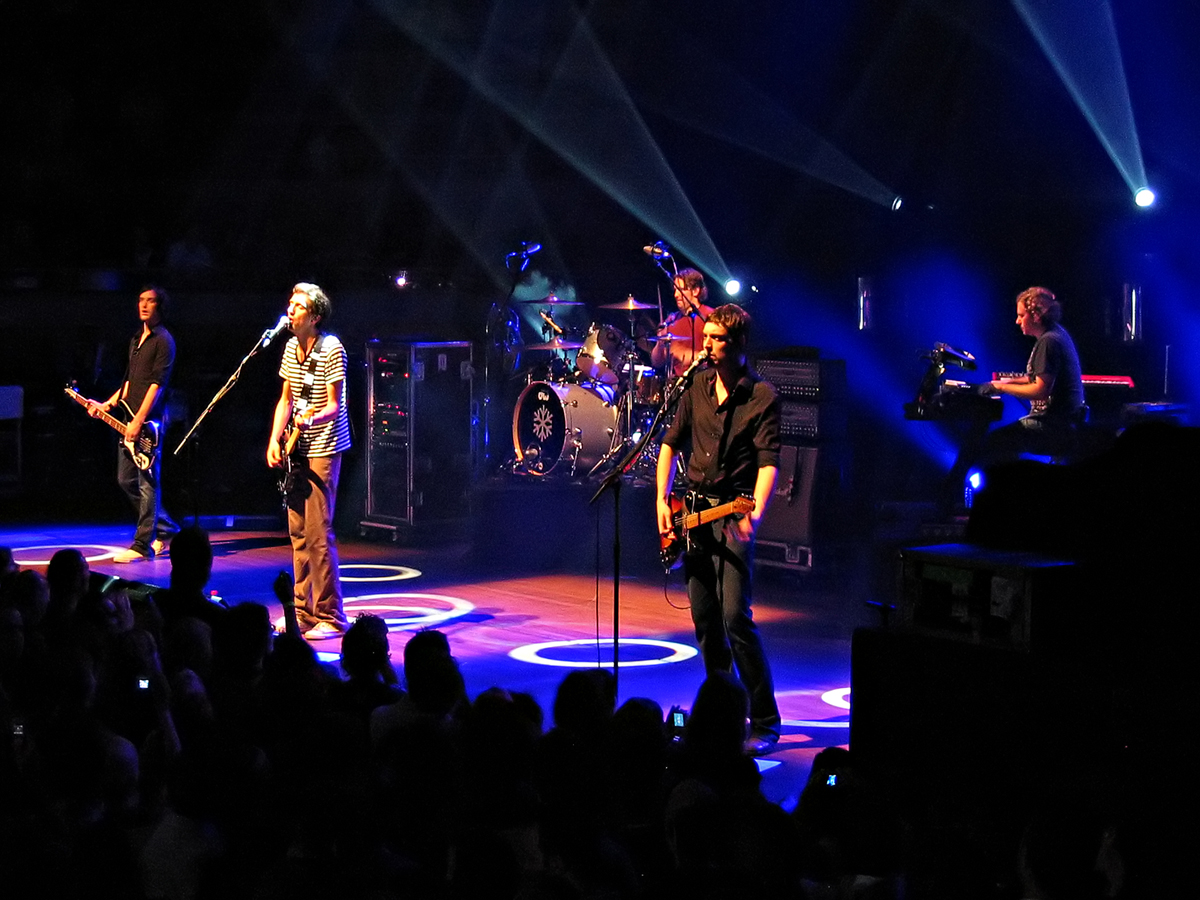
Snow Patrol spent eight weeks at number one on the UK Album Downloads Chart during the 2000s, more than any other artist.

The UK Album Downloads Chart is a weekly music chart that ranks the most downloaded albums in the United Kingdom. During the 2000s, the chart was compiled by the Official Charts Company (OCC) on behalf of the British music industry, and was based solely on Sunday-to-Saturday sales of non-subscription music downloads from selected online stores. The most successful artist of the decade was the British band Snow Patrol, who spent eight weeks at number one with their albums Eyes Open and A Hundred Million Suns. The record label that spent the most weeks at number one was Island Records – with an artist roster that included Florence and the Machine, Amy Winehouse and Keane, Island spent 22 weeks at number one with nine different albums.

Before the advent of music downloads, only sales of physical formats—such as CD, vinyl and cassette tape—contributed towards positions on the UK music charts. The first chart to record sales of downloads was the UK Singles Downloads Chart, which was launched in September 2004 to list weekly sales of single downloads. Downloaded singles were growing considerably at this time, rising ten-fold in the first half of 2005 compared to the same period in 2004. As single downloads grew in popularity, so did album downloads – 1.8 million albums were downloaded in 2005; a further 825,000 were downloaded during the first three months of 2006.

As a result of this growth, on 9 April 2006 the OCC began to include download sales alongside physical sales when compiling the UK Albums Chart. That same day, the OCC also launched a dedicated weekly chart based solely on sales of album downloads in the UK. Approximately 64,000 albums were downloaded during the week of the chart's launch, of which just under 2,000 were of This New Day by the British band Embrace, the chart's first number one. By the end of 2006 nearly 2.8 million album downloads had been purchased, which comprised 1.8% of the total album sales. The following year the UK's online music revenue grew to €42.1 million, which made the nation Europe's largest consumer of online music. By the end of the decade over 25 million albums had been downloaded and the market comprised 12.5% of total album sales. Following Embrace, a further 99 artists topped the chart; fifteen did so with two albums. Including original soundtracks and compilations, a total of 121 albums reached number one during the 2000s. As of February 2015, the UK Album Download Chart continues to be published each week by the OCC.

== Number-one albums ==
Key
| No. | nth album to top the UK Album Downloads Chart |
| re | Return of an album to number one |
| † | Most-downloaded album of the year |

| No. | Artist (Note: The artist, album, record label, date of reaching number one and number of weeks at number one are those given by the OCC.) | Album | Record label | Reached number one (for the week ending) | Weeks at number one |
2006
| 1 | Embrace | This New Day | Independiente | 15 April 2006 | 1 |
| 2 | The Streets | The Hardest Way to Make an Easy Living | 679/Locked On | 22 April 2006 | 1 |
| 3 | Shayne Ward | Shayne Ward | Syco | 29 April 2006 | 1 |
| 4 | Gnarls Barkley | St. Elsewhere | Warner Bros. | 6 May 2006 | 1 |
| 5 | Snow Patrol | Eyes Open † | Fiction | 13 May 2006 | 1 |
| 6 | Red Hot Chili Peppers | Stadium Arcadium | Warner Bros. | 20 May 2006 | 1 |
| re | Snow Patrol | Eyes Open † | Fiction | 27 May 2006 | 2 |
| 7 | Zero 7 | The Garden | Atlantic | 10 June 2006 | 1 |
| 8 | The Feeling | Twelve Stops and Home | Island | 17 June 2006 | 1 |
| 9 | Keane | Under the Iron Sea | Island | 24 June 2006 | 3 |
| 10 | Muse | Black Holes and Revelations | Helium 3/Warner Bros. | 15 July 2006 | 2 |
| 11 | Razorlight | Razorlight | Vertigo | 29 July 2006 | 2 |
| 12 | James Morrison | Undiscovered | Polydor | 12 August 2006 | 2 |
| 13 | Christina Aguilera | Back to Basics | RCA | 26 August 2006 | 1 |
| re | Snow Patrol | Eyes Open † | Fiction | 2 September 2006 | 3 |
| 14 | Justin Timberlake | FutureSex/LoveSounds | Jive | 23 September 2006 | 1 |
| 15 | Scissor Sisters | Ta-Dah | Polydor | 30 September 2006 | 2 |
| 16 | The Killers | Sam's Town | Vertigo | 14 October 2006 | 2 |
| re | Razorlight | Razorlight | Vertigo | 28 October 2006 | 1 |
| 17 | Robbie Williams | Rudebox | Chrysalis | 4 November 2006 | 1 |
| 18 | Amy Winehouse | Back to Black | Island | 11 November 2006 | 1 |
| 19 | Damien Rice | 9 | Heffa/14th Floor | 18 November 2006 | 1 |
| 20 | George Michael | Twenty Five | Aegean | 25 November 2006 | 1 |
| 21 | Oasis | Stop the Clocks | Big Brother | 2 December 2006 | 1 |
| 22 | Take That | Beautiful World | Polydor | 9 December 2006 | 5 |
2007
| re | Amy Winehouse | Back to Black † | Island | 13 January 2007 | 3 |
| 23 | The View | Hats Off to the Buskers | 1965 | 3 February 2007 | 1 |
| 24 | Norah Jones | Not Too Late | Blue Note | 10 February 2007 | 1 |
| 25 | Mika | Life in Cartoon Motion | Casablanca/Island | 17 February 2007 | 3 |
| 26 | Kaiser Chiefs | Yours Truly, Angry Mob | B-Unique/Polydor | 10 March 2007 | 1 |
| 27 | Arcade Fire | Neon Bible | Sonovox | 17 March 2007 | 1 |
| 28 | Joss Stone | Introducing Joss Stone | Relentless/Virgin | 24 March 2007 | 1 |
| re | Take That | Beautiful World | Polydor | 31 March 2007 | 1 |
| 29 | Kate Walsh | Tim's House | Blueberry Pie | 7 April 2007 | 1 |
| 30 | Kings of Leon | Because of the Times | Hand Me Down | 14 April 2007 | 2 |
| 31 | Mark Ronson | Version | Columbia | 28 April 2007 | 1 |
| 32 | Arctic Monkeys | Favourite Worst Nightmare | Domino | 5 May 2007 | 3 |
| 33 | Linkin Park | Minutes to Midnight | Warner Bros. | 26 May 2007 | 1 |
| 34 | Maroon 5 | It Won't Be Soon Before Long | A&M/Octone | 2 June 2007 | 2 |
| 35 | The Twang | Love It When I Feel Like This | B-Unique/Polydor | 16 June 2007 | 1 |
| 36 | Bon Jovi | Lost Highway | Mercury | 23 June 2007 | 1 |
| 37 | The White Stripes | Icky Thump | XL | 30 June 2007 | 1 |
| 38 | Editors | An End Has a Start | Kitchenware | 7 July 2007 | 1 |
| 39 | The Chemical Brothers | We Are the Night | Virgin | 14 July 2007 | 1 |
| 40 | Cherry Ghost | Thirst for Romance | Heavenly | 21 July 2007 | 1 |
| 41 | The Enemy | We'll Live and Die in These Towns | Warner Bros. | 28 July 2007 | 1 |
| 42 | Amy Macdonald | This Is the Life | Vertigo | 4 August 2007 | 1 |
| 43 | Newton Faulkner | Hand Built by Robots | Ugly Truth | 11 August 2007 | 5 |
| 44 | Hard-Fi | Once Upon a Time in the West | Atlantic/Necessary | 15 September 2007 | 1 |
| 45 | Kanye West | Graduation | Roc-A-Fella | 22 September 2007 | 1 |
| 46 | James Blunt | All the Lost Souls | Custard/Atlantic | 29 September 2007 | 1 |
| 47 | Foo Fighters | Echoes, Silence, Patience & Grace | RCA | 6 October 2007 | 2 |
| 48 | Jack Peñate | Matinée | XL | 20 October 2007 | 1 |
| 49 | Stereophonics | Pull the Pin | V2 | 27 October 2007 | 1 |
| 50 | The Hoosiers | The Trick to Life | RCA | 3 November 2007 | 1 |
| 51 | Britney Spears | Blackout | Jive | 10 November 2007 | 1 |
| 52 | Eagles | Long Road out of Eden | Polydor | 17 November 2007 | 1 |
| 53 | Leona Lewis | Spirit | Syco | 24 November 2007 | 2 |
| 54 | Kylie Minogue | X | Parlophone | 8 December 2007 | 1 |
| re | Leona Lewis | Spirit | Syco | 15 December 2007 | 1 |
| 55 | Led Zeppelin | Mothership | Atlantic | 22 December 2007 | 1 |
| 56 | Michael Bublé | Call Me Irresponsible | Reprise | 29 December 2007 | 1 |
2008
| re | Leona Lewis | Spirit | Syco | 5 January 2008 | 1 |
| 57 | Radiohead | In Rainbows | XL | 12 January 2008 | 2 |
| 58 | Various artists | Clubbers Guide '08 | Ministry of Sound | 26 January 2008 | 1 |
| 59 | Scouting for Girls | Scouting for Girls | Epic | 2 February 2008 | 1 |
| 60 | Adele | 19 | XL | 9 February 2008 | 1 |
| 61 | Jack Johnson | Sleep Through the Static | Brushfire/Island | 16 February 2008 | 2 |
| 62 | The Feeling | Join With Us | Island | 1 March 2008 | 1 |
| 63 | Goldfrapp | Seventh Tree | Mute | 8 March 2008 | 1 |
| 64 | Duffy | Rockferry | A&M | 15 March 2008 | 4 |
| 65 | R.E.M. | Accelerate | Warner Bros. | 12 April 2008 | 1 |
| 66 | The Courteeners | St. Jude | A&M | 19 April 2008 | 1 |
| 67 | The Kooks | Konk | Virgin | 26 April 2008 | 1 |
| 68 | The Last Shadow Puppets | The Age of the Understatement | Domino | 3 May 2008 | 1 |
| 69 | Madonna | Hard Candy | Warner Bros. | 10 May 2008 | 2 |
| 70 | Pendulum | In Silico | Warner Bros. | 24 May 2008 | 1 |
| 71 | The Ting Tings | We Started Nothing | Columbia | 31 May 2008 | 1 |
| 72 | Usher | Here I Stand | LaFace | 7 June 2008 | 1 |
| re | Duffy | Rockferry | A&M | 14 June 2008 | 1 |
| 73 | Coldplay | Viva la Vida or Death and All His Friends † | Parlophone | 15 June 2008 | 5 |
| 74 | Original soundtrack | Mamma Mia! | Polydor | 26 July 2008 | 1 |
| 75 | Various artists | Now That's What I Call Music! 70 | Virgin EMI/UMTV | 2 August 2008 | 2 |
| re | Original soundtrack | Mamma Mia! | Polydor | 16 August 2008 | 1 |
| 76 | The Script | The Script | Phonogenic | 23 August 2008 | 2 |
| 77 | The Verve | Forth | Parlophone | 6 September 2008 | 2 |
| 78 | Glasvegas | Glasvegas | Columbia | 20 September 2008 | 1 |
| 79 | Metallica | Death Magnetic | Vertigo | 27 September 2008 | 1 |
| 80 | Kings of Leon | Only by the Night | Hand Me Down | 4 October 2008 | 2 |
| 81 | Oasis | Dig Out Your Soul | Big Brother | 18 October 2008 | 1 |
| 82 | Keane | Perfect Symmetry | Island | 25 October 2008 | 1 |
| 83 | Original soundtrack | High School Musical 3: Senior Year | Walt Disney | 1 November 2008 | 1 |
| 84 | Snow Patrol | A Hundred Million Suns | Fiction | 8 November 2008 | 2 |
| re | The Verve | Forth | Parlophone | 22 November 2008 | 1 |
| 85 | Various artists | Now That's What I Call Music! 71 | Virgin EMI/UMTV | 29 November 2008 | 1 |
| 86 | The Killers | Day & Age | Vertigo | 6 December 2008 | 1 |
| 87 | Take That | The Circus | Polydor | 13 December 2008 | 1 |
| 88 | Various artists | Christmas Hits – 80 Festive Favourites | Rhino/Sony | 20 December 2008 | 3 |
2009
| 89 | Michael Jackson | King of Pop | Epic | 10 January 2009 | 1 |
| re | The Ting Tings | We Started Nothing | Columbia | 17 January 2009 | 1 |
| re | The Script | The Script | Phonogenic | 24 January 2009 | 1 |
| 90 | White Lies | To Lose My Life... | Fiction | 31 January 2009 | 1 |
| 91 | Bruce Springsteen | Working on a Dream | Columbia | 7 February 2009 | 1 |
| 92 | Lady Gaga | The Fame † | Interscope | 14 February 2009 | 1 |
| 93 | Lily Allen | It's Not Me, It's You | Regal | 21 February 2009 | 2 |
| 94 | The Prodigy | Invaders Must Die | Take Me to the Hospital | 7 March 2009 | 1 |
| 95 | U2 | No Line on the Horizon | Mercury | 14 March 2009 | 1 |
| 96 | Kelly Clarkson | All I Ever Wanted | RCA | 21 March 2009 | 1 |
| 97 | Noel Gallagher | The Dreams We Have as Children | Big Brother | 28 March 2009 | 1 |
| re | Lily Allen | It's Not Me, It's You | Regal | 4 April 2009 | 1 |
| re | Lady Gaga | The Fame † | Interscope | 11 April 2009 | 1 |
| 98 | Doves | Kingdom of Rust | Heavenly | 18 April 2009 | 1 |
| re | Lady Gaga | The Fame † | Interscope | 25 April 2009 | 1 |
| 99 | Depeche Mode | Sounds of the Universe | Mute | 2 May 2009 | 1 |
| 100 | The Enemy | Music for the People | Warner Bros. | 9 May 2009 | 1 |
| re | Lily Allen | It's Not Me, It's You | Regal | 16 May 2009 | 1 |
| 101 | Green Day | 21st Century Breakdown | Reprise | 23 May 2009 | 1 |
| 102 | Eminem | Relapse | Interscope | 30 May 2009 | 2 |
| 103 | Paolo Nutini | Sunny Side Up | Atlantic | 13 June 2009 | 1 |
| 104 | Kasabian | West Ryder Pauper Lunatic Asylum | Columbia | 20 June 2009 | 2 |
| 105 | Michael Jackson | Number Ones | Epic | 4 July 2009 | 2 |
| 106 | Florence and the Machine | Lungs | Island | 18 July 2009 | 6 |
| 107 | Calvin Harris | Ready for the Weekend | Columbia | 29 August 2009 | 1 |
| 108 | Arctic Monkeys | Humbug | Domino | 5 September 2009 | 2 |
| 109 | Jamie T | Kings & Queens | Virgin | 19 September 2009 | 1 |
| 110 | Muse | The Resistance | Helium 3/Warner Bros. | 26 September 2009 | 1 |
| 111 | Dizzee Rascal | Tongue n' Cheek | Dirtee Stank | 3 October 2009 | 1 |
| 112 | Paramore | Brand New Eyes | Fueled by Ramen | 10 October 2009 | 1 |
| 113 | Mumford & Sons | Sigh No More | Island | 17 October 2009 | 1 |
| 114 | Editors | In This Light and on This Evening | Kitchenware | 24 October 2009 | 1 |
| 115 | Alexandra Burke | Overcome | Syco | 31 October 2009 | 1 |
| 116 | Cheryl Cole | 3 Words | Fascination | 7 November 2009 | 1 |
| 117 | Foo Fighters | Greatest Hits | RCA | 14 November 2009 | 1 |
| 118 | Robbie Williams | Reality Killed the Video Star | Virgin | 21 November 2009 | 1 |
| 119 | Leona Lewis | Echo | Syco | 28 November 2009 | 1 |
| 120 | Susan Boyle | I Dreamed a Dream | Syco | 5 December 2009 | 2 |
| re | Various artists | Christmas Hits – 80 Festive Favourites | Rhino/Sony | 19 December 2009 | 1 |
| 121 | Rage Against the Machine | Rage Against the Machine | Epic | 26 December 2009 | 1 |

=== By artist ===
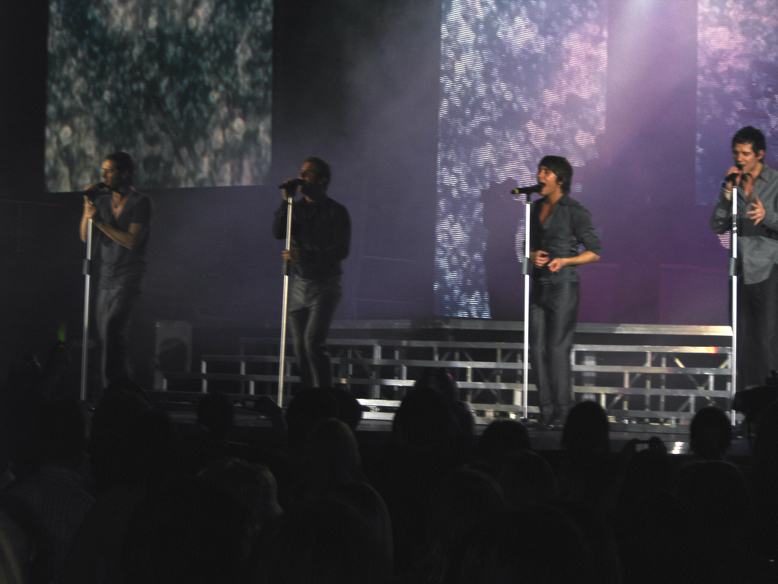
Take That were at number one for seven weeks with their albums Beautiful World and The Circus.

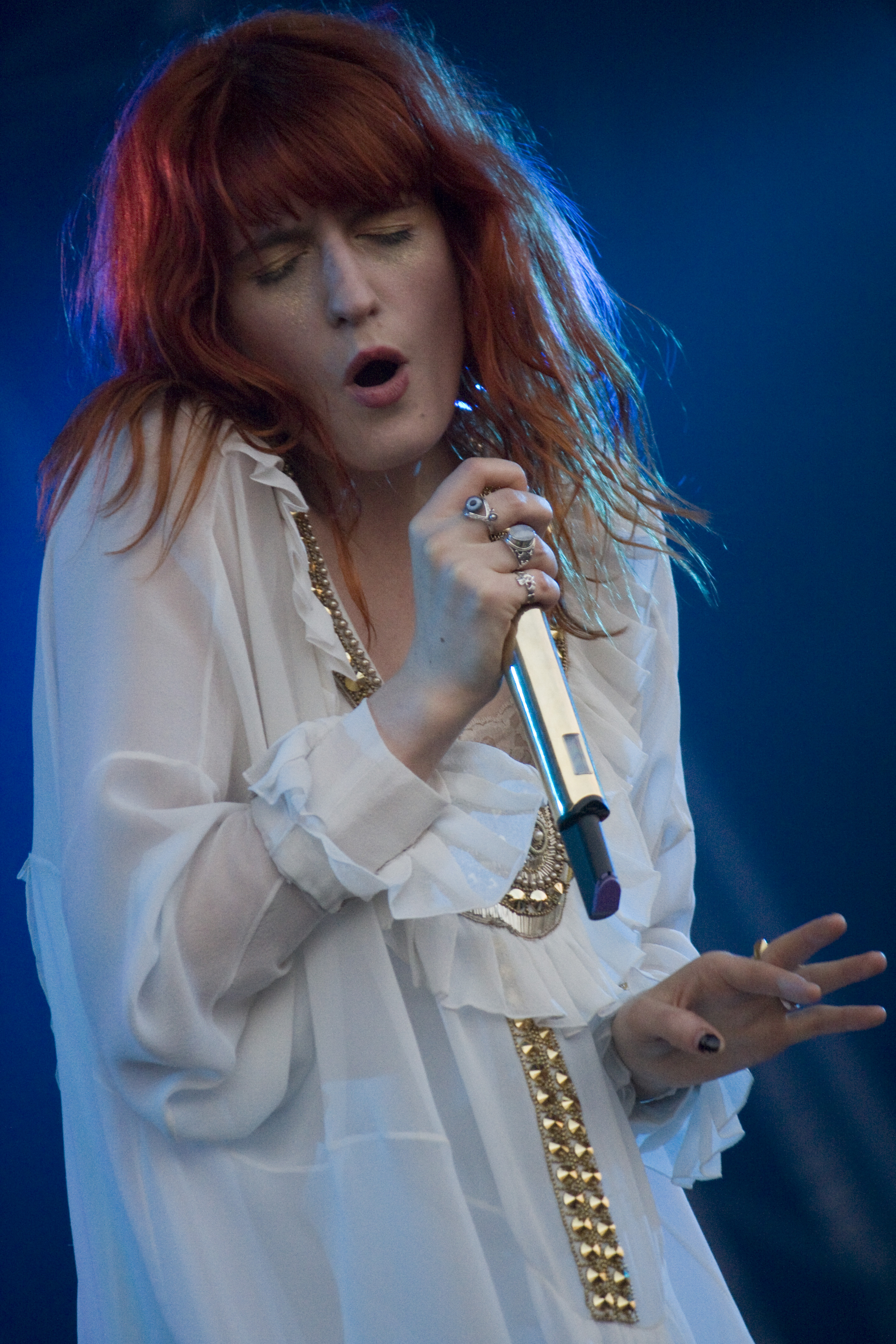
Florence and the Machine's debut Lungs spent six consecutive weeks at number one, more than any other album.

Twelve artists spent four or more weeks at the top of the UK Album Downloads Chart during the 2000s. The totals below include only credited performances, and do not include appearances on original soundtracks or compilation albums.

| Artist | Number-one albums | Weeks at number one |
|---|---|---|
| Lily Allen | 1 | 4 |
| Arctic Monkeys | 2 | 5 |
| Coldplay | 1 | 5 |
| Duffy | 1 | 5 |
| Newton Faulkner | 1 | 5 |
| Florence and the Machine | 1 | 6 |
| Keane | 2 | 4 |
| Kings of Leon | 2 | 4 |
| Leona Lewis | 2 | 5 |
| Snow Patrol | 2 | 8 |
| Take That | 2 | 7 |
| Amy Winehouse | 1 | 4 |

=== By record label ===
Nine record labels spent eight or more weeks at the top of the UK Album Downloads Chart during the 2000s.

| Record label | Number-one albums | Weeks at number one |
|---|---|---|
| A&M Records | 3 | 8 |
| Columbia Records | 6 | 8 |
| Fiction Records | 3 | 9 |
| Island Records | 9 | 22 |
| Parlophone | 3 | 9 |
| Polydor Records | 6 | 14 |
| Syco Music | 5 | 9 |
| Vertigo Records | 5 | 8 |
| Warner Bros. Records | 10 | 12 |

== Download sites ==
During the 2000s, the UK Album Downloads Chart was compiled by the OCC using data from the following music download websites:

- 7digital
- Big Noise Music
- Bleep
- City 16
- easyMusic
- HMV
- iTunes
- KarmaDownload
- Metacharge
- MSN Music
- The Music Engine Service
- MyCokeMusic
- Napster
- OD2
- Playlouder
- Recordstore
- Sonic Selector
- Tesco
- Tiscali Music
- Virgin
- Wanadoo
- Wippit
- Woolworths

== See also ==
- List of UK Compilation Chart number-one albums of the 2000s
