= You're Not Alone (The Enemy song) =

Single by The Enemy

from the album We'll Live and Die in These Towns
- B-side: "Five Years"; "Had Enough"; "Away from Here"
- Released: 17 September 2007
- Length: 3:44
- Label: Warner Bros.
- Songwriter: Tom Clarke
- Producer: Barny

The Enemy singles chronology
| "Had Enough" (2007) | "You're Not Alone" (2007) | "We'll Live and Die in These Towns" (2007) |

"You're Not Alone" is a song by The Enemy. The song is about Peugeot's Coventry factory closing down with the loss of 2,300 jobs. The song is on The Enemy's debut album We'll Live and Die in These Towns and was released as the fifth single from the album. The song was in the UK top 75 of the UK Singles Chart for four weeks, and its peak chart position was number 18, therefore marking their third UK top 20 single.

The single was released as a download, a CD single and two versions of 7" vinyl. The CD has one B-side, a cover version of David Bowie's song "Five Years". The first version of the vinyl is a square picture disc with the Electric Loop Orchestra remix of the band's previous single "Had Enough" as a B-side; on the second version there is a live version of "Away from Here" recorded for BBC Radio 1.
