= No Time for Tears =

No Time for Tears may refer to:

- No Time for Tears (film), 1957 British drama film
- "No Time for Tears" (Nathan Dawe and Little Mix song), 2020
- "No Time for Tears", 2009 song by the Enemy from their album Music for the People
- "No Time for Tears" (Pet Shop Boys song), 2016
