= Richard Emerson =

Richard Emerson may refer to:

- Richard Nicholas Emerson, English musician and actor
- Richard Emerson, founder of Emerson's Brewery
