= Godiva Festival =

Three-day music festival held each year in Coventry, England

Coordinates: 52.390132°N 1.523113°W

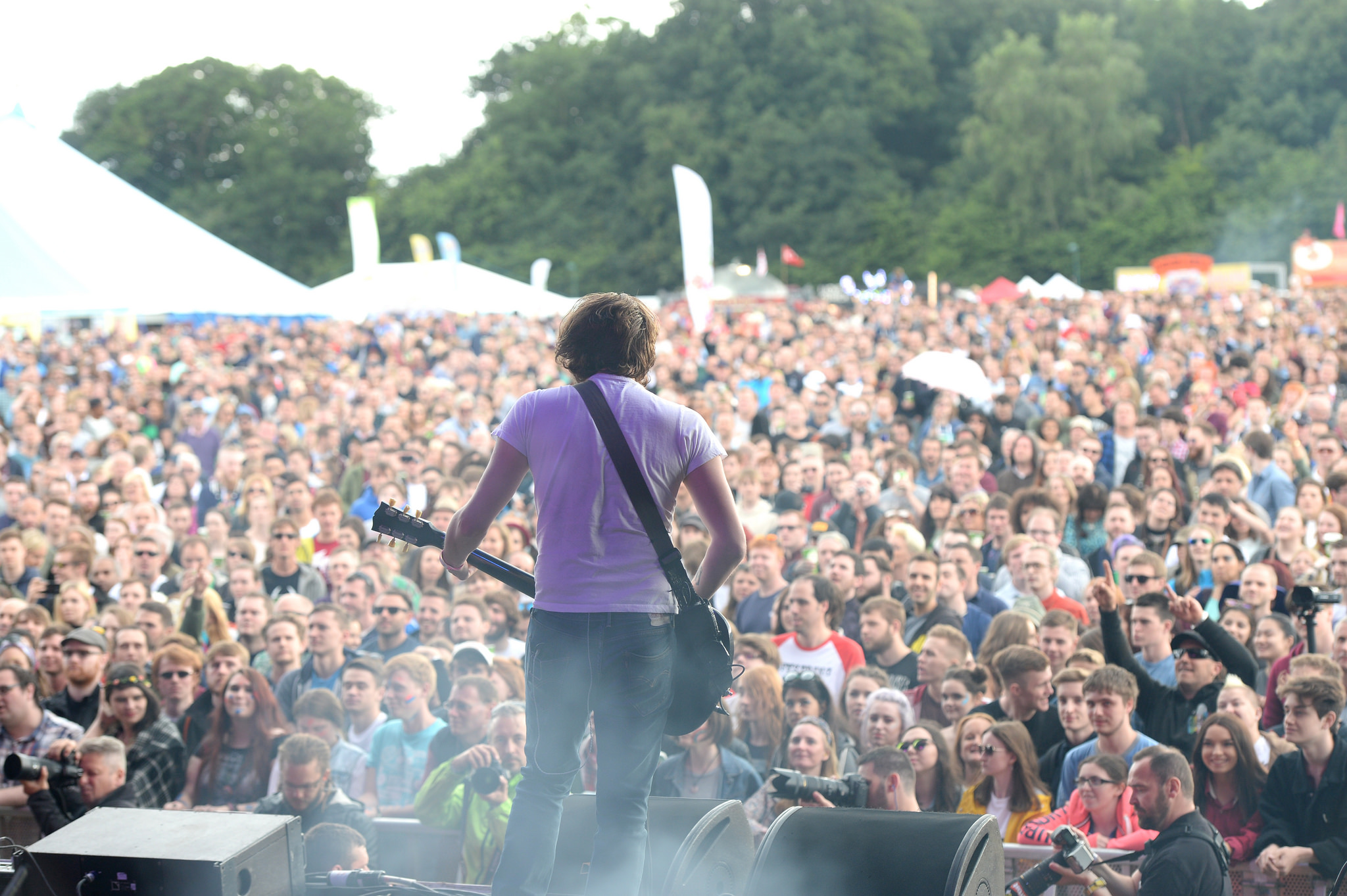
- Godiva Festival 2016
- Dates: July
- Locations: War Memorial Park, Coventry, England
- Years active: 1998–2019, 2021–
- Founders: Coventry and Warwickshire promotions /CVOne/Coventry City Council
- Capacity: 40,000
- Website: GodivaFestival.com

The Godiva Festival is a three-day music festival held each year in the War Memorial Park, Coventry, England, named after the city's famous former inhabitant Lady Godiva. It first appeared as a day-long event in 1997 and became a three-day event the following year in 1998. It is made up of two fields; a Main Field and a Family field, which each offer a different experience.

== Format ==
The modern three-day music festival is a non-profit making event organised by Coventry City Council.

The festival attracted 148,000 visits in 2016 to a 12-acre (49,000 m^{2}) site in Coventry's War Memorial Park.

The festival includes a dedicated Main Stage which has played host to a wide array of mainstream and independent acts, including Kasabian, Biffy Clyro, The Charlatans, The Boomtown Rats, Scouting For Girls, The Wombats, Don Broco, Embrace, Fun Lovin' Criminals, the Buzzcocks, the Happy Mondays and The Enemy. The other large stage on the Main Field is the Rock/Rhythm Tent, which plays host to rock/metal acts on Friday night, and has seen artists such as Neck Deep, Slaves and Kids in Glass Houses perform since its introduction in 2014. Saturday's Rhythm Tent has seen acts such as Fuse ODG, JME, Big Narstie and D Double E.

Other features of the festival include the Family Field, an Acoustic Stage, a Paradise Tent, food stalls, a Hilltop bar, craft stalls, an Urban Youth Tent, a vintage market and a fairground.

The Family Field often sees attractions such as a petting farm, charity village, Community Stage, Lives and Times area, Greenspace area, Make Space tent, a funfair, cycle training, falconry and visits from local groups such as the Coventry Bears and the Fire Service.

Godiva Festival was a free, ticketless festival, that anyone can attend, until ticketing and charges were introduced in 2019. In 2019 the capacity of the festival was 40,000.

== Lineups ==
=== 2025 ===
The 2025 festival took place from 4 to 6 July.

=== 2024 ===
The 2024 festival took place from 5 to 7 July. In February 2024, it was announced that the headliners were Richard Ashcroft, Paloma Faith and Beverly Knight. Other notable performers were Sam Ryder, and multiple acts including Standard Procedure and Holy Goof who performed on the Next Stage as part of the DnB takeover.

=== 2023 ===
The 2023 festival will take place from 30 June to 2 July. In February 2023, it was announced that The Enemy would headline on Friday 30 June. The Saturday headline was next to be announced as Rudimental. Mel C would be the headline for the Sunday and final day of the festival.

=== 2022 ===
The 2022 festival took place from 2 to 4 September, to avoid a clash with BBC Radio 1's Big Weekend. The headline acts were announced in April 2022, The Libertines played the Friday slot, Tom Grennan on Saturday and Bananarama headlined on Sunday.

=== 2021 ===
The 2021 festival took place from 3 to 5 September, but with a limited capacity because of the COVID-19 pandemic. The Saturday night headline was announced on 26 July 2021 as Craig David who would be performing his TS5 DJ Set. The headline act for the final day of the festival was announced as Sister Sledge, with Fun Lovin' Criminals and David Rodigan also appearing. Another performer for the Saturday was announced on 5 August 2021, Sophie Ellis-Bextor.

=== 2020 ===
The 2020 festival was announced as taking place from 3 to 5 July, but was cancelled in March 2020 as a result of the COVID-19 pandemic.

=== 2019 ===
The 2019 festival took place from 5 to 7 July. The first act to be announced was Busted who headlined on the closing day of the festival. Subsequently, Brighton based folk-rock band Levellers have been confirmed as headlining on the opening night (Friday). as well as Frank Iero and the Future Violents in the Rock & Rhythm tent. The Saturday headline act was announced as Welsh rock band Feeder. Cornflakes at Kelly's, a local Coventry punk band also performed their festival debut, on the main stage on Saturday too.

=== 2018 ===
The 2018 festival confirmed in February that it would take place from 31 August to 2 September. Ronan Keating was announced, in March 2018, as the Sunday headline act. A Saturday main stage act was announced at the end of April 2018 as Gabrielle. Other acts announced for the Saturday were Professor Green, Jonas Blue, Blood Red Shoes and Little Comets. The Friday night headliner was announced in June 2018 as Jake Bugg, at the same time Rae Morris and Kyle Falconer were announced as performers in the Rhythm Tent on the Saturday. As the end of July 2018 Editors were announced as the Saturday headline act on the main stage.

=== 2017 ===
Godiva Festival 2017 was confirmed in January 2017 for 7–9 July, and took place in the War Memorial Park. On 8 February 2017, The Darkness was announced as the Sunday headline act. On 20 February 2017, The Stranglers were confirmed as the Friday night headline act.

=== 2016 ===
Coventry Godiva Festival 2016 was confirmed in January 2016, and took place on 1–3 July in the War Memorial Park. The Friday night headline was the Boomtown Rats supported by Space. The Saturday headline was The Charlatans supported by Mystery Jets. The Sunday headline was Scouting for Girls, who were supported by The Pigeon Detectives.

The weekend saw Godiva Festival visited over 148,000 times and was the most successful festival to date.

Day	Main Stage	Rock/Rhythm Tent	Paradise Tent
Friday	The Ellipsis; Luna Kiss; Space; The Boomtown Rats	Wilde; Signs of Fire; The Prophets; Black Peaks; Neck Deep	Howard Read; Patrick Monahan; Ava Vidal; Tiernan Douieb; Jonathan Mayor; Mitch Benn
Saturday	Tell Me I'm Pretty; Quarry; The Session; Idle Noise; April; Ravens; FRONTEERS; Ekkah; The Subways; Mystery Jets; The Charlatans	The Larrks; The Paradimes; General Chaos; The Tuts; Kiko Bun; Easy Star All-Stars; Eyeden and Lia; The Society; Mugun; Jevan; Sox & Jaykae; C Cane; Yungen; D Double E	Launch of Coventry's UK City of Culture BID.
Sunday	Louie Forde; Andrew Ferris; Emma McGann; Cliff Hands; Sound of the Sirens; Pigeon Detectives; Milburn; Scouting for Girls	Closed on Sunday	Performances from Coventry's schools, academies, community groups and local people.

=== 2015 ===
The 2015 Godiva Festival took place from 3 to 5 July. The headline act for Friday was Fun Lovin' Criminals, Saturday The Wombats and Sunday Embrace.

Day	Main Stage	Rock Tent/Rhythm Tent/Young Entertainer	Paradise Tent
Friday	Rooted N Booted; King Phoenix; The Beat; Fun Lovin' Criminals	Pelugion; Shot Down Zed; Charles Dexter Ward; Baby Strange; Slaves	Ceilidh dance; Blast from the Past
Saturday	The Deserts; Quarry; The Prophets; The Seadogs; The Broken Rebels; Flygone; Carnival Youth; Spector; Pulled Apart by Horses; Don Broco; The Wombats	The Kubricks; The Skints; The Stiff Joints; Orange Street; Deadzone; The Society; Afrojosh; Nineties Boy; Mikill Pane; Double S; Lady Leshurr; Big Narstie; JME	Sid Bowfin; Abi Collins; Jones & Barnard; Dan the Hat; The Black Eagles; Silent disco
Sunday	Jake Melles and Harry Alexander; Danny Ansell; Callum Pickard and the Third Look; The King's Parade; Rhoda Dakar; Meadowlark; We Are The Ocean; Embrace	UV BEATZ; Aiyana; Three Souls; The Big Bang Theory; Ben Charley; Jeeves and Aron; Haunted Mousetrap; Coundon Court Students; UV BEATZ; Letitia George	Three Half Pints; Patrick Monahan; Tim Fitzhigham; Martin Mor; Andrew O'Neill; Sally Ann Hayward; Tiernan Douieb; Adam Hess; Jay Foreman

=== 2014 ===
The 2014 Godiva Festival took place from 4 to 6 July. The headline act was the Happy Mondays.

Day	Main Stage	Rock/Rhythm Tent	Paradise Tent
Friday	Yes Sunshine; Stone Foundation; The Selecter; Buzzcocks	Bad Horse; Symphony State; Scream Blue Murder; Baby Godzilla; Kids in Glass Houses	John Hatins; Darren Walsh; Kate Lucas; Seymour Mace
Saturday	Spooky Wagons; The Prophets; Hula Girls; Swamp Donkey; Jimmy Weston; Young Aviators; Little Matador; Funeral for a Friend; Dan Le Sac; We Are Scientists; Happy Mondays	The Activators; Barb'd Wire; King Hammon; Roddy Radiation & The Ska Billy Rebels; Neville Staple; Cream ov da Crop; Afrojosh; Duplex Family; Ghetts; Meridian Dan; Fuse ODG	Bread & Butter; Matt Barnard; Wolly; Balloonatic; Dan the Hat; Rannel; Silent disco
Sunday	The Mariachi Band; David Sanders; HE IS A PEGASUS; Nina Baker; Batsch; Horance Panter's Uptown Ska Collective; The Ordinary Boys; Lightning Seeds	Tile Hill Wood Choir; Coundon Court dance troupe; Laura Warwick; Pecan Grove; Jack Dickson Carvell; Out of the Blue; Richard Fairlee; The Commonjets; Reece Bahia; Sandra Godley	Bread & Butter; Matt Barnard; Wolly; Balloonatic; Bread & Butter; Dan the Hat; Rannel; Mariarchi Band

=== 2013 ===
The 2013 Godiva Festival took place from 5 to 7 July 2013. Friday was headlined by Echo & the Bunnymen who were to headline in the 2012 cancelled event. Saturday was headlined by Maxïmo Park and Sunday starred the Loveable Rogues and Amelia Lily. The festival claimed to have broken attendance records with over 125,000 visits being estimated over the three days.

Day	Main Stage	Rhythm Tent
Friday	Dark Actors; Pint Shot Riot; Ghostpoet; Echo & The Bunnymen	
Saturday	The Fallows; The Sixty Fours; Russian Gun Dogs; Reverend and the Makers; Concrete Knives; Mallory Knox; Steve Cradock; Lucy Rose; The View; Maximo Park	The Dualers; Riddimstone; Reggaelators; Lee Thompson's Ska Orchestra; Neville Staple; Matt Henshaw and ReggiMental; Samson; Influential; DeeLayDee; Scrufizzer; Charlie Brown; Sway; Devlin
Sunday	Masterclass Dhol Drummers; Freeman Dance; Severn Trent Choir; Sonrisa; Lexy; Tich; The Risk; Loveable Rogues; Amelia Lily	The Notables; Freeman Dance; Pandemonium Street Orchestra; The Belles of Three Spires; Barbershizzle; Reece Bahia; Pauline Quirke Dance Academy; Coventry Youth Jazz Orchestra; Craig Price

=== 2012 ===
The 2012 festival was scheduled to take place Friday 30 June to Sunday 1 July, but bad weather forced the event to be cancelled.

Friday was scheduled to be headlined by Echo & the Bunnymen with Space in support. Saturday was scheduled with Cast as headliners, with support from The View and The Pigeon Detectives. Sunday evening was scheduled to link in with the arrival of the Olympic torch relay and the lighting of the Olympic beacon in the park.

The festival was cancelled by Coventry City Council on 29 June 2012, owing to the recent 'bad weather conditions causing unstable ground'. The Olympic torch procession continued unaffected.

=== 2011 ===
The 2011 Godiva Festival took place from Friday 1 July to Sunday 3 July. The headline acts were Heaven 17 and Athlete, attended by a record-breaking crowd of 120,000 people.

=== 2010 ===
The 2010 Godiva Festival took place from Friday 2 July to Sunday 4 July.

=== 2009 ===
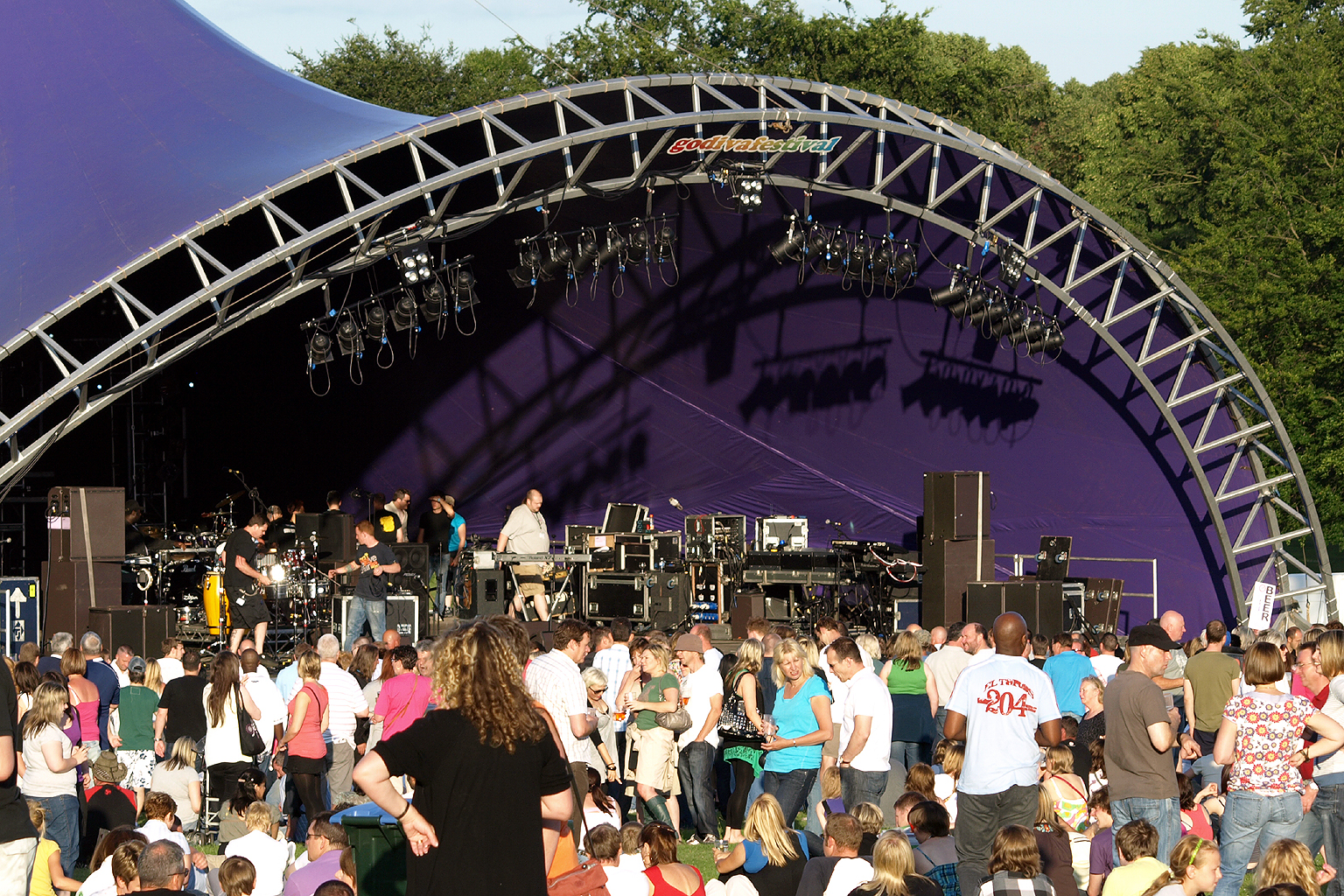
Electric Main Stage on Friday 3 July 2009

The 2009 Godiva Festival took place from Friday 3 July to Sunday 5 July, headlined by Scottish alternative band Idlewild.

Day	Electric Stage	Rhythm Tent
Friday	Go West; Womack and Womack; The Blow Monkeys	Jason Wood; Cole Parker; Jimmy McGhie; Carl Donnelly (compere)
Saturday	Idlewild; The Twang; The Eighties Matchbox B-Line Disaster; Toploader; Pint Shot Riot; Exit Calm; Just Morale; Echo Empire; Haunted By Humans; Satin Dolls	Freefall Collective; Seckou Keita; Drumalicious; Asian Strings, Skins and Spices; The Salsa Samba Sensation; Blind Pirates rhythm and blues band; Hip Hop – Coventry MDC
Sunday	Newton Faulkner; The King Blues; The Yeah You's; The Austin Francis Connection; A-Cappella Fellas; April Elizanbeth; PJ Wright; Thom Kirkpatrick; Fiona Cox; Rachel Challis; Jonny Darley; Sarah Ruddick; Stylusboy	Meet On The Ledge; Clarksville Mountain Band; Dave Swarbrick & Kev Dempsey; Trí; Gareth Davies-Jones; Harvey

=== 2008 ===
The 2008 Godiva Festival took place from Friday 4 July to Sunday 6 July, headlined by the Coventry band The Enemy.

Day	Electric Stage	Rhythm Tent	Spotlight Tent	Market Stage
Friday	Inner Circle; Tippa Irie; Ambelique; Michael Prophet	Johnny Mac; Rosko Pico; Jay Nana; DJ Christo	Akeal; The Bellows; Fiori; The Illchemists; Men in Caves; Shadowplay; Shakletons; Wes Finch and the Dirty Band	Ivan Brackenbury; Brendan Riley; Carl Donnelly
Saturday	The Enemy; Art Brut; Glasvegas; The Displacements; Six By Seven; The Ripps; Pint Shot Riot; Exit Calm; Shadowplay; Dogfight Revolution	Kanda Bongo Man; Mankala; Buffalo Soul Jah; Los Tropicales; Vamos; Claudio Kron	Kano; Yogz; Brotherman; KOF; Parly B; Unfriendly Neighbours; Reggiimental; TLG; C.O.Vs; DJ Frogeye; Kombat Breakers; Ricta; Italia UK; Charlie Healy; Zanity Dance Group; Evivo; Mc Dee & Crew; YIP Group; Hillz Fm; P'Nology (Warm up); Woodend DJ's	Linton Kwesi Johnson; Dreadlockalien; Kei Miller; Mario Petrucci; Jane Holland; Yusra Warsama; Irish Twin City Poets – Paul Casey, Jennifer Matthews and Billy Ramsell; Coventry's ScrubberJack; Mike McKimm
Sunday	Get Cape. Wear Cape. Fly; Gabriella Cilmi; Envy & Other Sins; Julian Velard; Austin Francis Connection; Gary Nock	Jez Lowe and Kate Bramley; Joe O'Donnell's Shkayla; Rob Halligan; The Oddsods; The QP; Dark Island; Kristy Gallacher	King Pleasure and the Biscuit Boys; Blue Harlem; The Big Easy	

=== 2007 ===
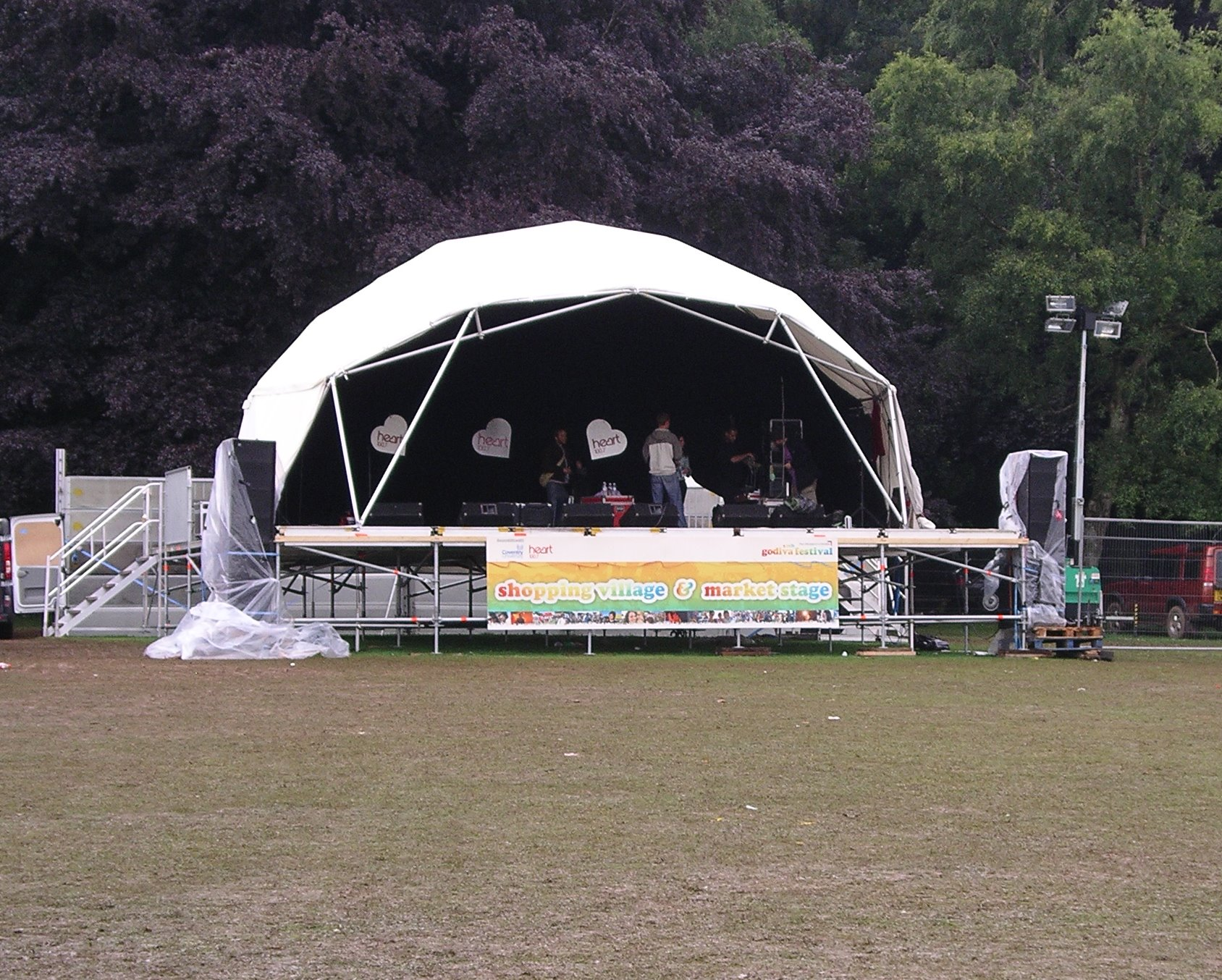
A stage at the Godiva Festival 2007

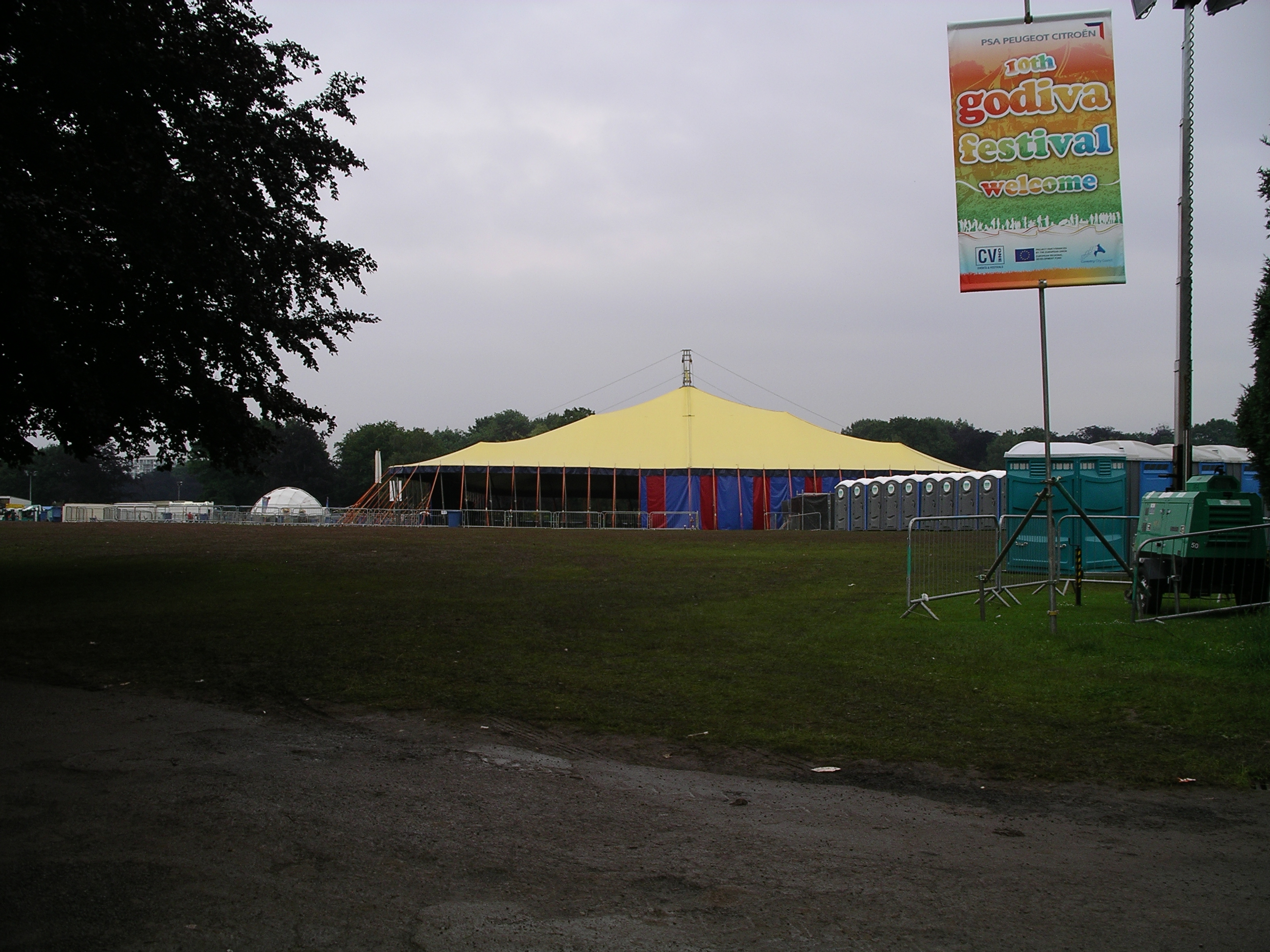
The Electric Stage at the Godiva Festival 2007

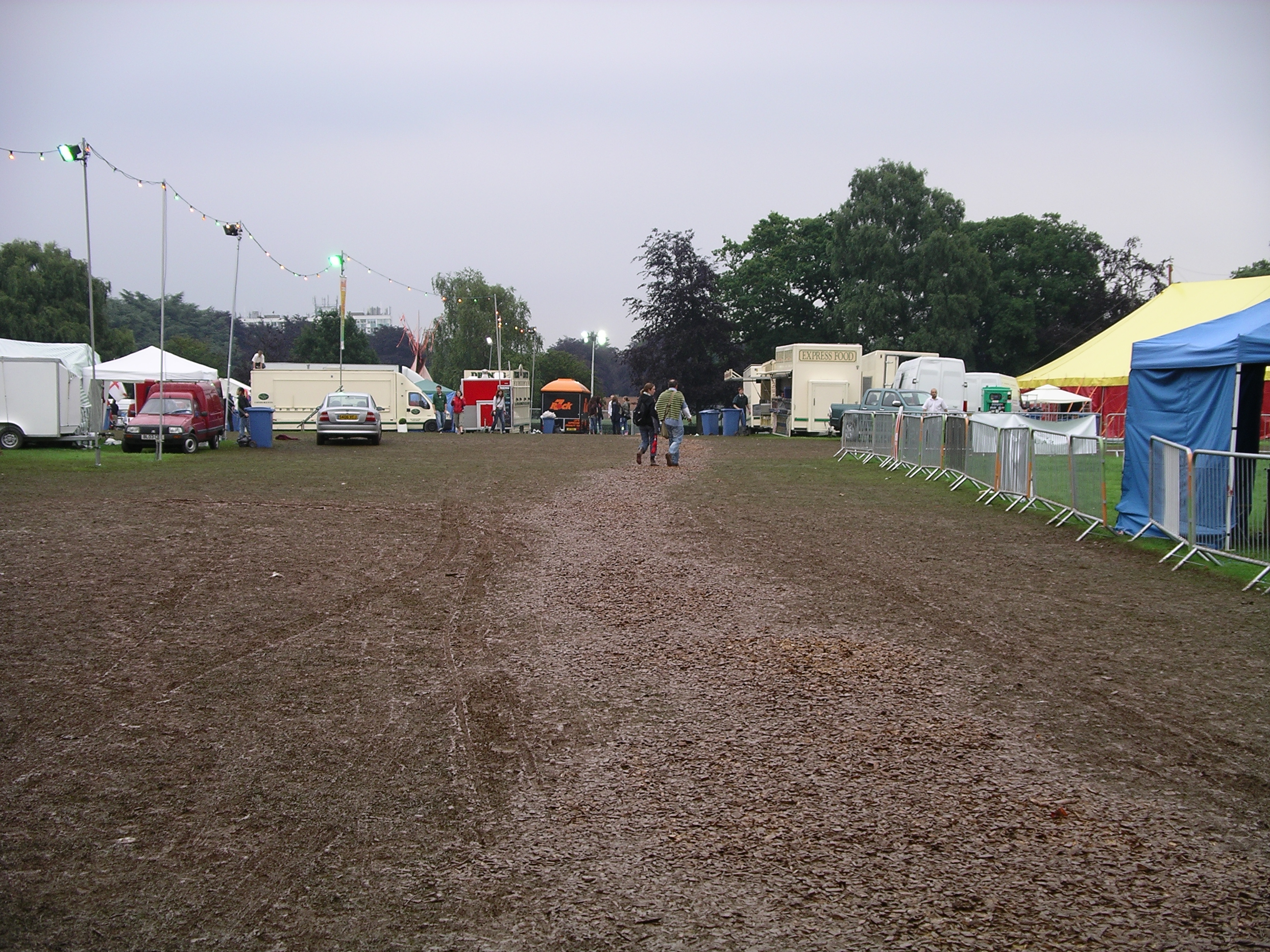
Superficial mud at the Godiva Festival 2007

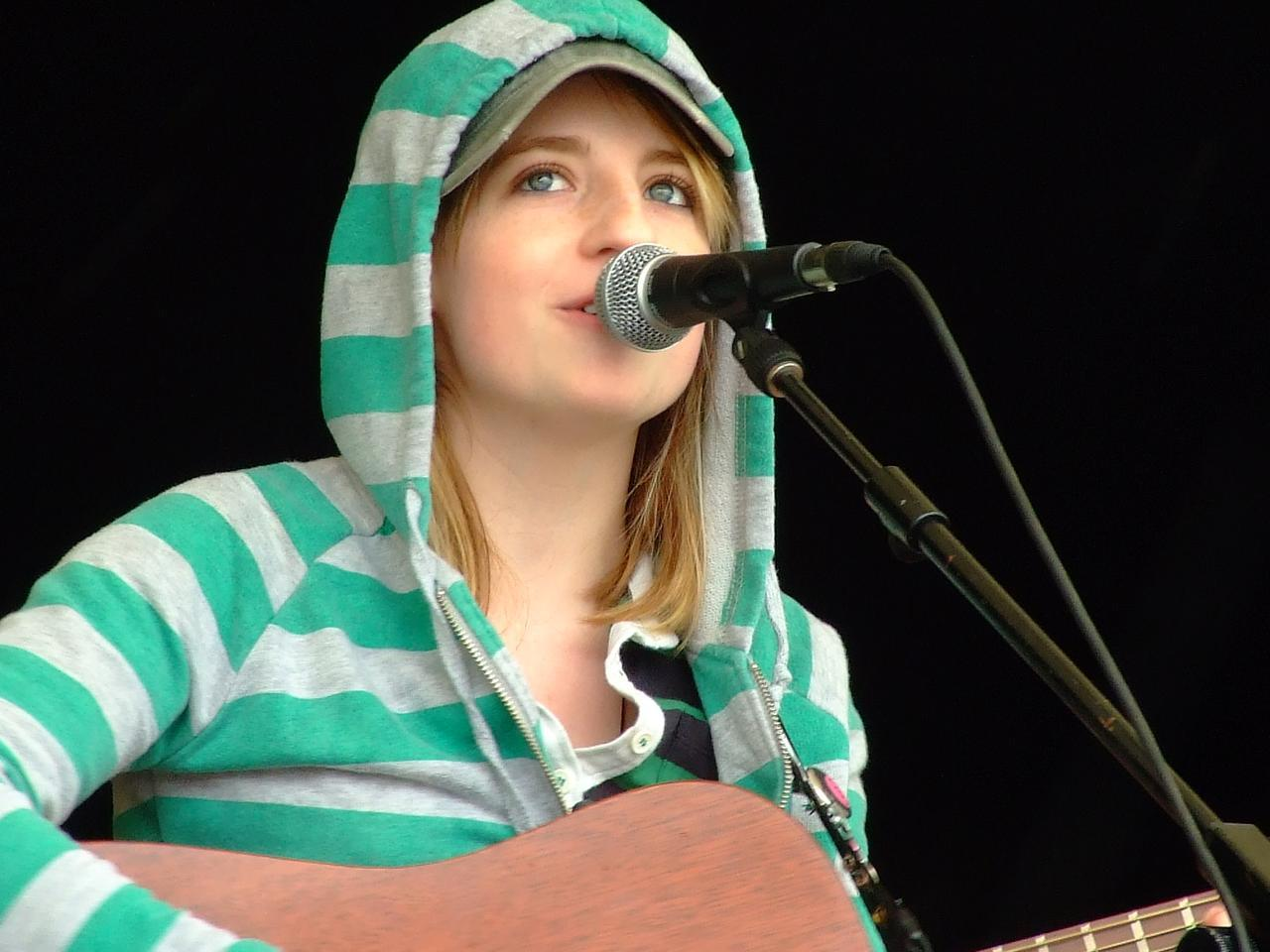
Kristy Gallacher performing on the Market Stage at the Godiva Festival 2007

The 2007 Godiva Festival took place from Friday 13 July to Sunday 15 July with headliners Super Furry Animals. It was also the tenth year for the festival.

Day	Electric Stage	Rhythm Tent	Spotlight Tent	Market Stage
Friday	The Human League; Broken Dolls	Mark Watson; MC Michael Legge; Topping and Butch; MC Dan Atkinson; Stuart Goldsmith	Sun, Zoom, Spark; DbMA; The Hearing; Men In Caves; The Carter Manoeuvre; Jamsons Nook; The Crooks; Little Girl Screaming	Decatone; Kifaru; Shakes & Shivers; Ottogono; What About Cube?; The Juliana Down
Saturday	Super Furry Animals; The Enemy; The Cribs; Noisettes; Maps; The Silent League; The Ripps; Vijay Kishore; Sun, Zoom, Spark; Fiori	Ozomatli; Siyaya; Drumalicious; Caliche; Hamana Bjemakan	Dj Spindoctor; KRS-One; Jehst; Preach & Baby J; Mistah Menace & White Shark; Genesis Elijah; Reggiimental; Tru Street Dance Crew	James Yorkston and The Athlete; Baby Dee; Adrian Crowley; Nalle
Sunday	The Syd Lawrence Orchestra & Singers; Back to Basie Orchestra	Sean Cannon; Isambarde; Jim Crawford; Clarksville Mountain Band; Abi Lanigan; Harbour Lights; Justine; Thom Kirkpatrick and the Beautiful Noise	Fools Paradise	Mr Hudson & The Library; Newton Faulkner; Polly Paulusma; Gary Nock; Declan Bennett; Chris Tye; BBC Coventry & Warwickshire's Singing City Choir; Lee Mitchell; Abi Lanigan; Al Britten; Suzy-Indygo; Kris Bucin; Jen Lexmond; Matt Fisher and Mike Nowland; Kristy Gallacher; Atlum Schema

=== 2006 ===
The 2006 festival took take place from Friday 14 July to Sunday 16 July with headliners Mercury Rev.

Day	Electric Stage	Rhythm Tent	Spotlight Tent	Paradise Tent
Friday	Leo Sayer; Kuki; Susanna Benn	Desmond Dekker Tribute; The Pioneers; Ambelique; King Daniel; Owen Uriah; King Stanley & RNT; Ziggy Natulus; Kifaru; Daddy Woody	Decatone; The Great Blind Degree; Death by Miss Adventure; Fiori; Trailer; hobo hotel exile; 7th Wave; What About Cube?	
Saturday	Mercury Rev; The Cooper Temple Clause; Nizlopi; The Fratellis; Blackbud; This is Seb Clarke; Milk Kan; Decatone; Linear; The Enemy	Calusio Kron De Brazil; Drumalicious; Shri Live & DJ Badmarsh; Siyaya; Brazilica	TY; Paragon; Big P; Skeme; Milliondan; Beat Poets	
Sunday	Spires Philharmonic Orchestra and Chorus; Spires Winds	Swarb Lazarus; The Oddsods; Rob Halligan and Gareth Davies-Jones; Joe O'Donnell's Shkayla; The Coventry Mummers; Eric Bogle; Carter Chapman; Dark Island; Pete Willow	Breaks Co-op; Misty's Big Adventure; Men Daimler; Devon Sproule; Vijay Kishore; Don't Move!; Tawt; Sumladfromcov; Cliff Hands; Laura Bettison; Lewis Garland; Lee Glasson; Wes Finch; Suzy-Indygo	

=== 2005 ===
The 2005 festival took place Friday 8 July to Sunday 10 July.

It was the first time the comedy stage appeared and featured Shappi Khorsandi. Also on the Friday night Nerina Pallot performed and John Burnside recited poetry.

On Saturday the main stage lineup was:

- Hundred Reasons
- The Others
- Little Barrie
- The Paddingtons
- Kid Carpet
- Dogs

Whilst EcoRhythm consisted of:

- Blak Twang
- Skinnyman
- Yungun
- Mr Thing

=== 2004 ===
The 2004 festival took place Friday 11 June to Sunday 13 June.

The Saturday-night main stage lineup was:

- The Datsuns
- Goldie Lookin Chain
- Young Heart Attack
- Kasabian

=== 2003 ===
The 2003 festival took place Friday 6 June to Sunday 8 June.

The Saturday-night main stage lineup included:

- Shed Seven
- Har Mar Superstar
- The Eighties Matchbox B-Line Disaster

=== 2002 ===
The 2002 festival took place Friday 7 June to Sunday 9 June. It was the fifth year the festival had taken place.

Bands who played include:

- Biffy Clyro
- Six by Seven
- Budapest

=== 1998 ===
The second Godiva Festival was held on Friday 5 until Sunday 7 June 1998.
The main-stage headline acts on the two weekend days were Banco de Gaia and Silinder Pardesi, respectively.
