= We'll Live and Die in These Towns (song) =

Single by The Enemy

from the album We'll Live and Die in These Towns
- B-side: "Ordinary Girl"; "Happy Birthday Jane"
- Released: 3 December 2007
- Length: 3:04 (UK single edit); 3:52 (album version)
- Label: Warner Bros.
- Songwriter: Tom Clarke

The Enemy singles chronology
"You're Not Alone" (2007)	"We'll Live and Die in These Towns" (2007)	"This Song Is About You" (2008)

"We'll Live and Die in These Towns" is a song by British indie rock band The Enemy from their debut album of the same name. The single was released on 3 December 2007 and peaked at number 21 on the UK Singles Chart.

== Music video ==
In November 2007, a video was filmed for this song by WMG. The video shows three members of the group in the evening riding in the car and looking through the window at their home city of Coventry. Tom Clarke sings about his native city, where the group was founded, and which, despite all the disadvantages stay native forever.

== Coventry City F.C. ==
Over the course of the 2023–24 season, the song became the unofficial anthem of The Enemy's hometown football club Coventry City. The first verse and chorus of the song is played just before kick off at home matches at The CBS Arena.

The 'Sky Blue Army's rendition of "We'll Live and Die in These Towns" before the 2024 FA Cup semi-final with Manchester United went viral and the use of the song by the club has been widely praised amongst football supporters owing to its originality and connection to the City of Coventry.

In November 2025, The Enemy were invited to perform the song live before a game against Sheffield United at The CBS Arena.

== Certifications ==
Region	Certification	Certified units/sales
United Kingdom (BPI)	Silver	200,000^{‡}
^{‡} Sales+streaming figures based on certification alone.
