= Not Thinking Straight =

Not Thinking Straight may refer to:

- Not Thinking Straight (Matt Fishel album)
- "Not Thinking Straight", a song by Pint Shot Riot
