= Had Enough =

Had Enough may refer to:

- "Had Enough" (Don Toliver song), 2019
- "Had Enough" (The Enemy song), 2007
- "Had Enough" (The Who song), 1978
- "Had Enough", a song by Breaking Benjamin from Phobia, 2006
- "Had Enough", a song by Elliphant, 2020
- "Had Enough", a song by Lifehouse from Smoke & Mirrors, 2010
- "Had Enough", a song by Papa Roach from Metamorphosis, 2009

== See also ==
- I've Had Enough (disambiguation)
