= Ripps =

Ripps may refer to:

- The Ripps, English rock band
- Ryder Ripps, American conceptual artist
- Ripps Island, an island in the Potomac River in Washington, D.C
- RiPPs, Ribosomally synthesized and post-translationally modified peptides

== See also ==
- Ripp (disambiguation)
