= Streets in the Sky =

Studio album by The Enemy
- Released: 21 May 2012
- Genres: Indie rock; punk rock
- Length: 40:38
- Labels: Cooking Vinyl; eOne
- Producer: Joby J. Ford

The Enemy chronology
Music for the People (2009)	Streets in the Sky (2012)	It's Automatic (2015)

Singles from Streets in the Sky
- 1. "Saturday" Released: 15 May 2012; 2. "Like a Dancer" Released: 16 July 2012

Streets in the Sky is the third studio album by English indie rock band The Enemy, released on 21 May 2012 through Cooking Vinyl and eOne Music. It entered the UK Albums Chart at number nine.

== Release ==
The song "Saturday" was released in May 2012 as the first single from Streets in the Sky. In the spring there were two versions of the video for the song (one of them is acoustic). The song was also included in FIFA 13, the video game by EA Sports as a soundtrack. The music video shows the members of the band singing on the blue background with words "Streets in the Sky" on the walls.

The second single, "Like a Dancer", was released on 16 July 2012 and reached No. 9 in the UK Albums Chart. A music video for "Like a Dancer" was published to YouTube. "Like a Dancer" was recorded at Kore Studios, and was published by EMI Music Publishing. It is licensed to Cooking Vinyl.

== Reception ==
Professional ratings
Review scores
Source	Rating
AllMusic	2/5 stars
Coventry Telegraph	(favourable)
Drowned in Sound	0/5 stars
The Fly	1/5 stars
musicOMH	1.5/5 stars
NME	6/10
PopMatters	2/10
Sputnikmusic	2.0/5
The Quietus	(unfavourable)
York Vision	(unfavourable)

Critical reception was generally negative, with Album of the Year rating it as the worst album of 2012 as reviewed by critics. The album scored 2.9/10 at aggregator website AnyDecentMusic? (the fifth-lowest rated album of all time). However, NME gave the album a mixed review.

== Track listing ==
All songs were written by The Enemy.

No.	Title	Length
1.	"Gimme the Sign"	3:09
2.	"Bigger Cages (Longer Chains)"	2:57
3.	"Saturday"	3:12
4.	"1-2-3-4"	2:59
5.	"Like a Dancer"	3:09
6.	"Come into My World"	2:57
7.	"This Is Real"	4:38
8.	"2 Kids"	3:56
9.	"Turn It On"	3:33
10.	"It's a Race"	3:29
11.	"Get Up and Dance"	3:52
12.	"Make a Man"	2:47

=== Music videos ===
- "1-2-3-4" (acoustic)
- "Gimme the Sign"
- "Saturday"
- "Saturday" (acoustic)
- "Like a Dancer"
