= Had Enough (The Enemy song) =

2007 single by the Enemy

Single by The Enemy

from the album We'll Live and Die in These Towns
- B-side: "Dancin' All Night"; "Shed a Tear"; "40 Days and 40 Nights"
- Released: 25 June 2007
- Length: 2:39
- Label: Warner Bros.
- Songwriter: Tom Clarke
- Producer: Barny

The Enemy singles chronology
"Away from Here" (2007)	"Had Enough" (2007)	"You're Not Alone" (2007)

"Had Enough" is a song by British rock band The Enemy from their debut studio album, We'll Live and Die in These Towns (2007). Released on 25 June 2007, "Had Enough" became the band's highest-charting single in the United Kingdom, peaking at number four on the UK Singles Chart in July 2007.

== Track listing ==
UK CD single

1. "Had Enough"
2. "Dancin' All Night"

UK 7-inch picture disc

A. "Had Enough"
B. "Shed a Tear"

UK 7-inch single

A. "Had Enough"
B. "40 Days and 40 Nights" (Zane Lowe session)

== Credits and personnel ==
Credits are lifted from the UK CD single and the We'll Live and Die in These Towns booklet.

Studio

- Mastered at Alchemy (London, England)

Personnel

- The Enemy – writing
- Barny – production, mixing
- John Davis – mastering
- Tourist – artwork design

== Charts ==
=== Weekly charts ===
Chart (2007)	Peak position
Europe (Eurochart Hot 100)	14
Scottish Singles Sales (Official Charts)	3
UK Singles (Official Charts)	4

=== Year-end charts ===
Chart (2007)	Position
UK Singles (OCC)	176
