= B-Sides (The Enemy album) =

2008 iTunes-exclusive album by The Enemy

Compilation album by The Enemy
- Released: 6 April 2008
- Recorded: 2006–2007
- Genres: Indie rock; punk rock
- Length: 37:56
- Label: Warner Bros.
- Producers: Barny; John Poole; Matt Terry

The Enemy chronology
We'll Live and Die in These Towns (2007)	B-Sides (2008)	Music for the People (2009)

B-Sides is an iTunes-exclusive album from British indie rock band The Enemy. It was released on 6 April 2008 and consists of ten songs that were B-sides to the single releases from their debut album We'll Live and Die in These Towns.

== Track list ==
1. "Fear Killed the Youth of Our Nation" – 3:31
2. "Get Blown Away" (Ocean Colour Scene cover) – 3:41
3. "Waste Your Life Away" (B-side to It's Not OK) – 4:26
4. "Let Me Know" – 2:59
5. "Happy Birthday Jane" (piano version) – 2:43
6. "Five Years" (David Bowie cover) – 4:31
7. "Away From Here" (Radio 1 live lounge) – 3:00
8. "Ordinary Girl" – 4:09
9. "You're Not Alone" (Neoteric remix) – 6:39
10. "A Message to You Rudy" (Dandy Livingstone cover ft. Neville Staple from the Specials) – 2:13
