= I've Had Enough =

I've Had Enough may refer to:

- "I've Had Enough" (Wings song), from the 1978 album London Town
- "I've Had Enough" (Earth, Wind & Fire song), from the 1981 album Raise!
- "I've Had Enough" (The Who song), from the 1973 album Quadrophenia

== See also ==
- Had Enough (disambiguation)
- "I've Had Enough (Into the Fire)", song from the 1984 Kiss album Animalize
- Let Me Up (I've Had Enough), 1987 album by Tom Petty and the Heartbreakers
