= Away from Here (song) =

2007 single by the Enemy

Single by The Enemy

from the album We'll Live and Die in These Towns
- B-side: "Fear Killed the Youth of Our Nation"; "Back Like a Heart Attack"; "A Message to You Rudy"
- Released: 16 April 2007
- Length: 3:01
- Label: Warner Bros.; Stiff
- Songwriter: Tom Clarke
- Producer: Barny

The Enemy singles chronology
"It's Not OK" (2007)	"Away from Here" (2007)	"Had Enough" (2007)

"Away from Here" is the third single from English rock band The Enemy's debut album, We'll Live and Die in These Towns (2007). It was the band's first single to enter the UK top 10, peaking at number eight on the UK Singles Chart. It is believed this song was inspired by the band's visit to Jersey, Channel Islands.. This was later denied by Tom Clarke on the XS Long Player podcast where he said the song was in fact inspired by listening to insipid songs on the radio in bandmate Andy's car saying: "Something was on the radio and it was rubbish. I remember getting really grumpy and saying 'why can no one write a chorus anymore just do this...' and then sung the whole of the verse and the whole of the chorus to 'Away from Here'".

== Track listings ==
UK CD single

1. "Away from Here"
2. "Fear Killed the Youth of Our Nation"

UK 7-inch single (Warner Bros.)

A. "Away from Here" – 3:01
B. "Back Like a Heart Attack" – 3:24

UK 7-inch single (Stiff)

A. "Away from Here" – 3:01
B. "A Message to You Rudy" (Dandy Livingstone cover feat. Neville Staple of The Specials) – 2:13

== Charts ==
Chart (2007)	Peak position
Scottish Singles Sales (Official Charts)	5
UK Singles (Official Charts)	8

== Certifications ==
Region	Certification	Certified units/sales
United Kingdom (BPI)	Silver	200,000^{‡}
^{‡} Sales+streaming figures based on certification alone.
