= Sandra Godley =

Sandra Godley OBE (born 27 April 1964) is a British singer-songwriter, broadcaster, and philanthropist. She received a MOBO Award nomination in 2013 for Best Gospel Act a British Citizen award in 2024 for her contribution to music and the arts She was appointed Officer of the Order of the British Empire (OBE) in the 2024 New Years Honours list for charitable work in the West Midlands

== Early life and education ==
Godley was born in Bristol, England, to Jamaican parents, Lincoln and Linneth Gordon. Growing up in a musical household, she developed a passion for music at a young age, often singing in church and participating in community events. Godley graduated from Nottingham Trent University in Sept 2013 with a BA in Leadership and Management.

== Career ==
Her record Miracle earned her a MOBO Award nomination for Best Gospel Act in 2014. Godley's music spans genres such as gospel, soul and R&B. She has performed at the Godiva Festival,. In addition to her musical career, she is a broadcaster who has hosted programs on networks such as BBC Radio 4, TBN UK, BBC CWR local radio shows, and Mercy Ships. She hosted tCoventry City of Culture Trust celebratory event at FarGo Village, Coventry.

== Philanthropy and humanitarian work ==
In 2018, she directed a choir of individuals with physical and mental challenges to record "The Big Love Song," as a wedding gift for Prince Harry and Meghan Markle. and charity single.

She serves as a Patron of Highly Sprung Performance, a physical theatre company and was an ambassador for Feed the Hungry, an organisation dedicated to combatting global hunger.

Sandra has been appointed President of Coventry & Warwickshire Chamber of Commerce, becoming the second ever female president.

== Awards and honours ==
- Appointment as an Officer of the Order of the British Empire (OBE) in the 2024 King's New Year Honours List for her charitable and community services.
- The British Citizen Award, presented at the Palace of Westminster, for her contributions to society.
- Woman in Music award, Wise Woman awards
- Named as one of Coventry and Warwickshire's 'Most Inspirational Ladies' for International Women's Day in 2023

== Discography ==
- My Darling (2021)
- Reflections (2019)
- Miracle (2014)
