= Ripp =

Ripp may refer to:

== As a surname ==
- Andrew Ripp, American singer-songwriter
- Artie Ripp, American music industry executive
- Hans-Jürgen Ripp, German association football player
- Keith Ripp, American politician

== Other ==
- Friend Ripp, a 1923 German silent film
- RiPP, Ribosomally synthesized and post-translationally modified peptides

== See also ==
- Ripps (disambiguation)
