= Pint Shot Riot =

Musical group

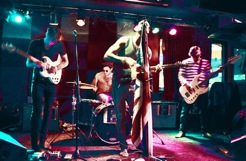
- Pint Shot Riot at The Red Lion, NYC. March 2011

Background information
- Origin: Coventry, England
- Genres: Indie Rock
- Years active: 2007–present
- Labels: Life in the Big City Records
- Members: Richard 'Rocket' Emerson; Rob Clements; David 'Baby Dave' Page; Chris 'Mini Rocket' Connoll
- Website: www.pintshotriot.co.uk

Pint Shot Riot are an indie rock band from Coventry, England. Their line-up consists of Richard 'Rocket' Emerson (guitar / vocals), Chris 'Mini Rocket' Connoll (drums / backing vocals), David 'Baby Dave' Page (bass) and Rob Clements (lead guitar / backing vocals).

== History ==
Pint Shot Riot's line-up was completed in January 2007 when, after a successful rehearsal, guitarist Rob Clements joined cousins Richard Emerson and Chris Connoll and their new-found bass player David Page. The name of the band was derived from an observation made by Emerson who, when using predictive text to message a friend, noticed that the three words are all entered using the same numerical combination and, according to Page, "it just seemed a perfect fit". In the summer of 2007, the band appeared on the BBC Introducing stage at Glastonbury Festival and released their début single "Punches, Kicks, Trenches & Swords" through their own Life in the Big City label the following October.

In July and October 2008, the band released the singles "Start Digging" and "Holes" and also signed a publishing deal with the EA Games / Nettwerk Music Group later in the year.

March 2009 saw the release of their first EP, Round One, comprising the three earlier singles and their B-sides plus an acoustic version of the new track "Not Thinking Straight". In October 2009, the full band version of "Not Thinking Straight" was featured on the soundtrack for EA Sports, FIFA 10 computer game. A Redanka remix of the band's next single, "Nothing From You", would also be included on a computer game soundtrack, this time on the soundtrack for Electronic Arts' game Need For Speed: Hot Pursuit.

In June 2010, to coincide with the 2010 FIFA World Cup, the band recorded and released "Viva England", a charity single for the Homeless World Cup charity. Also that summer, the band made their second appearance at Coventry's Godiva Festival, following up a performance at the event a year earlier. In May 2012, "Viva England" was re-released with a new 'Extra Time' version for UEFA Euro 2012, again with all proceeds going towards the Homeless World Cup charity.

The band's début album, Spell It Out, was released in March 2011. The record's single "Twisted Soul" featured on the soundtrack for FIFA 12, and also appeared on the BBC's Final Score bulletin.

The album's release coincided with a performance at an official South By Southwest Festival showcase in Austin, Texas, and soon after they began a West Coast US tour. Their year of sporadic US touring ended with a show at New York's CMJ Music Marathon, when the group appeared at the Brooklyn Bowl with The Duke Spirit.

== Discography ==
=== Albums ===
Year	Title	Release Date
2011	Spell It Out	7 March 2011

=== EPs ===
Year	Title	Release Date
2009	Round One	2 March 2009

=== Singles ===
Year	Title	Release Date	Album
2007	"Punches, Kicks, Trenches & Swords"	29 October 2007	Round One
2008	"Start Digging"	7 July 2008	Round One
2008	"Holes"	27 October 2008	Round One
2009	"Come Back to Me"	5 October 2009	Spell It Out
2009	"Not Thinking Straight"	5 October 2009	Spell It Out
2010	"Nothing from You"	24 May 2010	Spell It Out
2010	"Viva England"	7 June 2010	non-album single
2010	"Hazy Days"	25 September 2010	Spell It Out
2011	"Somebody Save Me"	21 March 2011	Spell It Out
2011	"Twisted Soul"	26 September 2011	Spell It Out
2012	"Starting to Fly"	26 March 2012	Spell It Out
2012	"Viva England / Viva England (Extra Time Version)"	28 May 2012	

==== Nothing from You ====
The song "Nothing from You" was remixed by Redanka.

== Use of Tracks ==
- "Punches, Kicks, Trenches & Swords" featured in the computer games The Sims 3 and Ricky Hatton's walk on music in Fight Night Round 4.
- Not Thinking Straight was used in FIFA 10 and Need for Speed: Nitro.
- "Treacle Town" and the band were featured in the trailer for the computer game Army of Two.
- "Somebody Save Me" was used on Soccer AM during their Championship goals round-up.
- Twisted Soul was included on the EA Sports for FIFA 12.
- The radio edit of the Redanka Remix of "Nothing from You" was featured on Need for Speed: Hot Pursuit. The actual remix clocks in at 4:11, and the original song clocks in at 7:58.
