= Richard Nicholas Emerson =

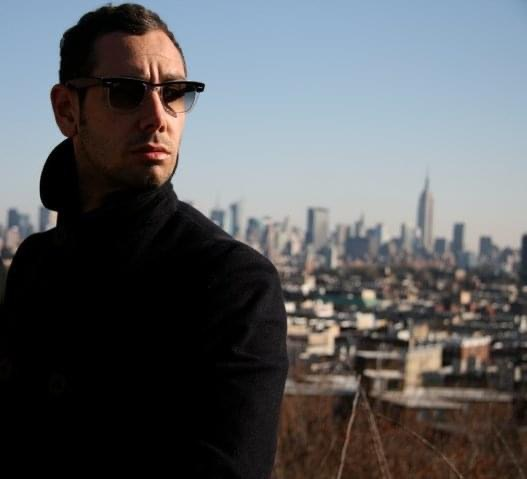
- Richard Nicholas Emerson in NYC 2011

Background information
- Also known as: Rocket
- Born: 25 March 1982 (age 43); Coventry
- Genres: Indie rock
- Occupation(s): musician, songwriter, actor
- Instrument(s): vocals, guitar

Richard Nicholas Emerson, also known as Richard 'Rocket' Emerson or Rocket, is an English musician and actor. He gained prominence as the frontman and principal songwriter for the indie band Pint Shot Riot in the years 2007 – 2013 and was nominated in 2014 for best actor at the Maverick Movie Awards for his acting debut in the independent feature film The Trailer.

== Early life ==
Emerson was born in Coventry, on 25th March 1982. He started acting at the age of 12 in various local city and school productions. He was given the nickname 'Rocket' because he used to work in the Coventry pub of the same name (near the railway station). He taught himself guitar at the age of 21 and a few years later he formed the band Pint Shot Riot.

== Music career ==
Pint Shot Riot began performing in January 2007, with Richard 'Rocket' Emerson as the frontman (lead vocals and rhythm guitar) and as the main songwriter. In the summer of the same year, they appeared on the BBC Introducing stage at Glastonbury Festival and next year, in 2008, they signed a publishing deal with the EA Games / Nettwerk Music Group. Some of their songs featured in Electronic Arts games like FIFA 10, FIFA 12 or Need for Speed: Hot Pursuit.

== Discography ==
The Pint Shot Riot discography with Richard Nicholas Emerson as frontman and principal songwriter:

=== Albums ===
Year	Title	Release Date
2011	Spell It Out	7 March 2011

=== EPs ===
Year	Title	Release Date
2009	Round One	2 March 2009

=== Singles ===
Year	Title	Release Date	Album
2007	"Punches, Kicks, Trenches & Swords"	29 October 2007	Round One
2008	"Start Digging"	7 July 2008	Round One
2008	"Holes"	27 October 2008	Round One
2009	"Come Back to Me"	5 October 2009	Spell It Out
2009	"Not Thinking Straight"	5 October 2009	Spell It Out
2010	"Nothing from You"	24 May 2010	Spell It Out
2010	"Viva England"	7 June 2010	non-album single
2010	"Hazy Days"	25 September 2010	Spell It Out
2011	"Somebody Save Me"	21 March 2011	Spell It Out
2011	"Twisted Soul"	26 September 2011	Spell It Out
2012	"Starting to Fly"	26 March 2012	Spell It Out
2012	"Viva England / Viva England (Extra Time Version)"	28 May 2012	

== Acting career ==
Emerson studied acting at The Lee Strasberg Theatre and Film Institute in New York City, in 2010. He debuted in the 2014 independent feature film The Trailer (nominated for best actor at Maverick Movie Awards). He shot a few short films and a US TV commercial, as well as starring in the Pint Shot Riot Starting To Fly music video, as a troubled soldier with PTSD.

== Filmography ==
=== Film ===
Year	Title	Role	Genre
2014	The Trailer	Sgt. Hopper • Lee Emmett	Short film
2025	I Was Honey Boo Boo	Geno Doak	Biography/Drama
2025	Sunday Lunch	Father Richards	Short film
Post-Production	Bravado	Artie	Thriller

=== Television ===
Year	Title	Role	Notes
2025	The Sandman	VIP Funeral Guest	S2.E10
In Production	The Sunshine Murders	Stavros Papadopoulos	

== Personal life ==
Emerson lived in New York City in 2010 and moved to Clifton in Bristol in 2015. Together with his wife Louise, he built a vintage clothing business called "Loot", with several stores, before scaling back to one store in Bristol at the end of 2022 to focus on his acting career. He has two sons called Jude and Sonny.
