= List of best-selling music downloads by year in the United Kingdom =

This is the list of the best-selling music downloads in the UK each year.

== Most-downloaded singles by year ==
Year	Single	Artist	Record label	Ref.
2004	"Vertigo"	U2	Universal	
2005	"You're Beautiful"	James Blunt	Warner	
2006	"A Moment Like This"	Leona Lewis	Sony	
2007	"Grace Kelly"	Mika	Universal	
2008	"Hallelujah"	Alexandra Burke	Sony	
2009	"Poker Face"	Lady Gaga	Warner	
2010	"Love the Way You Lie"	Eminem featuring Rihanna	Universal	
2011	"Someone Like You"	Adele	Beggars	
2012	"Somebody That I Used to Know"	Gotye featuring Kimbra	Universal	
2013	"Blurred Lines"	Robin Thicke featuring T.I. and Pharrell	Universal	
2014	"Happy"	Pharrell Williams	Sony	
2015	"Uptown Funk"	Mark Ronson featuring Bruno Mars	Sony	
2016	"7 Years"	Lukas Graham	Warner	
2017	"Shape of You"	Ed Sheeran	Warner	
2018	"This Is Me"	Keala Settle	Warner	
2019				
2020	"Blinding Lights"	The Weeknd	Universal	
2021	"Bad Habits"	Ed Sheeran	Warner	
2022	"Food Aid"	LadBaby	Sony	
2023	"Flowers"	Miley Cyrus	Sony	
2024	"Lose Control"	Teddy Swims	Warner	

== Most-downloaded albums by year ==
Year	Album	Artist	Record label	Ref.
2006	Eyes Open	Snow Patrol	Universal	
2007	Back to Black	Amy Winehouse	Universal	
2008	Viva la Vida or Death and All His Friends	Coldplay	EMI	
2009	The Fame	Lady Gaga	Universal	
2010	Sigh No More	Mumford & Sons	Universal	
2011	21	Adele	Beggars	
2012				
2013	Bad Blood	Bastille	Universal	
2014	x	Ed Sheeran	Warner	
2015	25	Adele	Beggars	
2016				
2017				
2018	The Greatest Showman	Motion Picture Cast Recording	Warner	
2019				
2020				
2021				
2022				
2023	Trustfall	Pink	Sony	
2024	Moon Music	Coldplay	Warner	

== See also ==
- List of best-selling compilation albums by year in the United Kingdom
