= The Enemy (English rock band) =

English indie rock band

- The Enemy live at Wembley Stadium in July 2009

Background information
- Origin: Coventry, West Midlands, England
- Genres: Indie rock; alternative rock; punk rock
- Years active: 2006–2016; 2022–present
- Labels: Warner Bros.; Cooking Vinyl; Stiff; eOne; VAM
- Members: Tom Clarke; Andy Hopkins; Liam Watts
- Website: www.theenemyband.co.uk

The Enemy (known as The Enemy UK in the United States) are an English indie rock band formed in Coventry in 2006. The band's debut album We'll Live and Die in These Towns (2007) went straight to number one in the UK Albums Chart on release. Their second album Music for the People (2009) went to number two on the UK Albums Chart. Streets in the Sky, their third studio album, was released on 21 May 2012 and was also their third UK top 10 album. Their fourth studio album, It's Automatic, was released on 9 October 2015. After disbanding in 2016, the band reunited in 2022 for two reunion shows in their hometown of Coventry and a UK tour, with a fifth album. Social Disguises, released on 20 February 2026.

== History ==
=== Formation and early recordings (2006–07) ===
Bass player Andy Hopkins and drummer Liam Watts originate from Coventry, while frontman and multi-instrumentalist Tom Clarke is originally from Birmingham, later moving to Coventry. Clarke attended Finham Park Secondary School in the city during his teenage years, with Hopkins attending Heart of England School in nearby Balsall Common, while Watts studied at the city's Cardinal Newman secondary school.

The Enemy met their original manager, John Dawkins, because Watts' aunt worked with one of Dawkins' family members. Dawkins asked producer Matt Terry to do him a favour and give the band cheap studio time. Terry then produced their first set of three songs: 'Heart Attack', 'Had Enough' and '40 Days and 40 Nights'. Dawkins then forwarded the demos to David Bianchi at A&R Warner.

In 2006 the band were the opening act at Coventry's Godiva Festival, an event they would play for the next two years, making their way to the headline slot.

=== We'll Live and Die in These Towns (2007–08) ===
They first gained acclaim when they were mentioned in NME as the act most likely to "break your windows" for 2007. They supported Oasis, The Fratellis, Kasabian, The Paddingtons, Ash, Manic Street Preachers, The Rolling Stones and Stereophonics on their UK tours.

In June 2007, The Enemy played twice at Glastonbury Festival, first in the 'Guardian Lounge' on Saturday and then the much larger 'Other Stage' on Sunday. They also headlined on the Saturday night of T in the Park in the 'Futures' tent on 7 July 2007.

Their single, "Away from Here" entered the charts at number 8 and its follow-up "Had Enough" entered the charts at number 4. Building on their rapid exposure, The Enemy appeared on the NME 2007 Rock 'N' Roll Riot Tour during September and October 2007 along with Lethal Bizzle and The Wombats as well as the Jersey Live Festival. They also supported The Rolling Stones on the last night of their European tour at the O2 Arena.

In September 2007, Alex Zane, presenter of the Xfm Breakfast Show broadcast a statement declaring that the band would not be played on his show again. After playing their single "You're Not Alone" for seven seconds, he reasoned that altercations between himself and the band over a television interview meant that they would no longer be played by him. However, during the Xfm Review of 2008, the presenters Sunta Templeton and Matt Dyson commented on the band and Zane making up.

A musical – also titled "We'll Live and Die in These Towns" – featuring and based on the songs from the album, ran in The Belgrade Theatre Coventry from 29 September 2018 to 20 October 2018. Clarke was the musical director of the project.

=== Music for the People (2008–09) ===
March 2008 saw the band start production on their second album and playing six nights in a row at the London Astoria. In April 2008 the band played at Coventry's Ricoh Arena, selling out two nights. The next month they supported Kaiser Chiefs at Elland Road Stadium. They then headlined the Godiva Festival on 5 July 2008, a 30,000 capacity free gig in Coventry's War Memorial Park. They played Reading & Leeds Festivals on the main stage in August.

Along with Kasabian and Twisted Wheel, The Enemy supported Oasis on their 2009 Dig Out Your Soul Tour, which included the Ricoh Arena gig in The Enemy's hometown of Coventry. In March and April 2009 the band embarked on their own UK & Ireland tour, playing to 70,000 people, with Twisted Wheel as support as well as Kid British. Birmingham singer Emma Skipp joined them on "No Time for Tears". The Enemy were forced to pull out of Oasis's Heaton Park concert on 4 June due to Clarke suffering from food poisoning. Although the band returned the following night they were replaced on the middle night of Oasis' Wembley Stadium three night run by Reverend and The Makers. The Coventry trio said that they were forced to pull out of their performance on 11 July because Clarke fell ill due to lily poisoning.

=== Streets in the Sky (2012–13) ===
After they finished touring Music for the People, the band took a two-year break before commencing work on their third album, playing the occasional show in the form of secret gigs.

The Enemy announced in 2011 that work had begun on their third album and had around 30 songs already written. They revealed the album was set to be released around late spring 2012, and also revealed that they had returned to their more original style of their debut album. The band signed to the Cooking Vinyl record label, working with original manager John Dawkins and new album producer Joby Ford (The Bronx). Tracks for the third album were recorded in London and Los Angeles.

On 21 February 2012, in a blog post made by Clarke, the band announced the title of the album would be Streets in the Sky, and that they would be releasing a free single, "Gimme the Sign". The album included tracks such as "This Is Real" (which the band put on their website in demo form), "Saturday", "1-2-3-4" and "Bigger Cages (Longer Chains)" .The album was released on 21 May 2012, originally the same day as the first of two gigs in the ruins of Coventry Cathedral. However, on 15 May 2012 the venue was changed to the Kasbah nightclub due to health and safety issues.

On 10 April it was announced that The Enemy would perform at the FA Cup final at Wembley Stadium on 5 May. The band performed two songs from the third album Streets in the Sky before the match, from the roof of the stadium. This was also broadcast live as part of ESPN's Talk of the Terrace show, along with the game.

The album garnered negative reviews; incredulously more so than its predecessor. Some reviews were particularly scathing.

In June 2012 they announced a UK tour, beginning on 28 September in Weston-super-Mare and concluding on 26 October in Birmingham, with the band appearing in many major UK cities.

It was announced on 6 September 2012 that the single "Saturday" from Streets in the Sky was to be featured in the soundtrack of the EA Sports game, FIFA 13.

The Enemy headlined Crooked Ways Festival in West Yorkshire on 1 June 2013 and performed at Y Not Festival in Derbyshire on 4 August 2013.

=== It's Automatic (2014–15) ===
The Enemy announced their fourth and final studio album would be titled It's Automatic and would be released on 9 October 2015. The first single taken from the album was "Don't Let Nothing Get in the Way", released on 7 July 2015.

It's Automatic received mixed reviews upon release. An uncredited article in the Coventry Telegraph focused on the more positive reviews, leading with the Daily Star's "They're having a blast and back on peak form" comment. For the music-specific NME, Barry Nicolson concluded a 3/5 review with a less positive: "...and while it's sometimes ham-fisted, you can't fault it for being heartfelt." While for Truck & Driver magazine's regular music reviews, editor Pip Dunn commenced his 2 of 5 star review with: "Sadly it’s a bit of a letdown from a three-man band that had previously been lauded as a saviour of guitar-based rock, with meaningful lyrics."

=== Hiatus and Clarke's solo career (2016–21) ===
In 2016, Clarke announced that the band would be splitting up for the foreseeable future, citing a multitude of reasons such as personal health issues, fatherhood and lack of exposure.

In the following years, Clarke embarked on a solo career. He toured frequently, mainly performing acoustic versions of classic Enemy songs.

In April 2021, Clarke released his debut studio album, The Chronicles of Nigel. He released a second album titled The Other Side, in February 2023.

=== Reunion tours (2022–23) ===
On 30 October 2021, during his solo show at the HMV Empire in Coventry, Clarke was joined on stage by his ex-bandmates, as he announced a comeback gig on 28 October 2022. The following day, the band announced a full UK reunion tour to celebrate 15 years of their debut album, We'll Live and Die in These Towns.

The Enemy then continued their return to the stage with a sold out UK tour across a host of O2 venues. This 2022 tour concluded with three sold out shows in their hometown Coventry (HMV Empire).

In 2023, The Enemy make their long-awaited return to the UK festival circuit. This included appearances at TRNSMT, Isle of Wight Festival, Warrington’s Neighbourhood Weekender, and Friday of Coventry’s Godiva Festival.

=== Indie til I Die tour (2024) ===
In 2024 the band announced their return to the studio. They played in two shows in late 2024 with The Subways and The Holloways as part of the Radio X Indie til I Die tour.

=== UK Tour and Social Disguises (2025–26) ===
The Enemy announced a host of shows taking place across the UK in late 2025. This is accompanied with a select handful of appearances across the summer 2025 festival circuit as well as a large scale outdoor gig scheduled in Newcastle.

Their 5th album, Social Disguises, was released on 20 February 2026. They headlined a concert at War Memorial Park to celebrate Coventry City's very successful 2025–26 season.

== Styles and influences ==
The Enemy aim to make music about friendship and social commentary like The Sway, 6 times, The Jam, and The Libertines. Tom Clarke has said that bands such as The Clash and Oasis have had a "huge influence on our friendships within the band and with our families. These bands taught us to open our hearts".

== Line-up ==
- Tom Clarke – lead vocals, guitar, piano, strings on album
- Andy Hopkins – bass guitar, vocals
- Liam Watts – drums

== Discography ==
=== Studio albums ===
Title	Album details	Peak chart positions				Certifications
Title	Album details	UK	UK Indie	IRE	SCO	Certifications
We'll Live and Die in These Towns	Released: 9 July 2007; Label: Warner Bros.; Format: CD, digital download	1	—	63	1	BPI: Platinum
Music for the People	Released: 27 April 2009; Label: Warner Bros.; Format: CD, digital download	2	—	41	2	BPI: Gold
Streets in the Sky	Released: 21 May 2012; Label: Cooking Vinyl, eOne; Format: CD, digital download	9	3	—	2	
It's Automatic	Released: 9 October 2015; Label: VAM; Format: CD, digital download	21	5	—	9	
Social Disguises	Released: 20 February 2026; Label: Self-released; Format: CD, Vinyl, digital download	-	-	—	-	
"—" denotes a title that did not chart, or was not released in that territory.

=== Compilation albums ===
Title	Details	Peak chart positions		Certifications
Title	Details	UK	IRE	Certifications
B-Sides	Released: 6 April 2008 (iTunes only); Label: Warner Bros.; Format: Digital download	—	—	

=== Singles ===
List of singles, with selected chart positions and certifications
Title	Year	Peak chart positions				Certifications	Album
Title	Year	UK	UK Rock	POL	SCO	Certifications	Album
"40 Days and 40 Nights"	2006	—	—	—	—		We'll Live and Die in These Towns
"It's Not OK"	2007	—	—	—	—		We'll Live and Die in These Towns
"Away from Here"	2007	8	—	43	5	BPI: Silver	We'll Live and Die in These Towns
"Had Enough"	2007	4	—	—	3		We'll Live and Die in These Towns
"You're Not Alone"	2007	18	—	—	13		We'll Live and Die in These Towns
"We'll Live and Die in These Towns"	2007	21	—	—	12	BPI: Silver	We'll Live and Die in These Towns
"This Song Is About You"	2008	41	—	—	6		We'll Live and Die in These Towns
"No Time for Tears"	2009	16	—	—	3		Music for the People
"Sing When You're in Love"	2009	122	–	—	9		Music for the People
"Be Somebody"	2009	193	—	—	—		Music for the People
"Gimme the Sign"	2012	—	35	—	—		Streets in the Sky
"Saturday"	2012	—	—	—	—		Streets in the Sky
"Like a Dancer"	2012	—	—	—	—		Streets in the Sky
"This Is Real"	2012	—	—	—	—		Streets in the Sky
"It's Automatic"	2015	—	—	—	—		It's Automatic
"—" denotes a title that did not chart, or was not released in that territory.

=== Music videos ===
Year	Name
2006	"40 Days and 40 Nights"
2006	"It's Not OK"
2007	"Away from Here"
2007	"Had Enough"
2008	"We'll Live and Die in These Towns"
2008	"You're Not Alone"
2008	"This Song is About You"
2009	"No Time for Tears"
2009	"Sing When You're in Love"
2009	"Be Somebody" (live)
2011	"1-2-3-4" (acoustic)
2012	"Saturday"
2012	"Gimme the Sign"
2012	"Like a Dancer"
2015	"It's Automatic"
2025	"Not Going Your Way"
2025	"Trouble"
2026	"Social Disguises" (live)

== Music industry awards ==
- Q Awards – Best New Act (awarded October 2007)
- XFM Awards – Best British Debut Album of 2007 (awarded January 2008)
- NME Awards – Best New Band (awarded February 2008)
