= Blackstar Amplification =

UK-based manufacturer of guitar amplification and effects pedals

- Type: Private
- Industry: Amplification
- Founded: 2007; 19 years ago
- Founder: Ian Robinson, Bruce Keir
- Headquarters: Northampton, United Kingdom
- Area served: Worldwide
- Key people: Ian Robinson (managing director); Bruce Keir (former technical director)
- Products: Amplifiers, effect pedals, accessories
- Services: Manufacturing
- Owner: Blackstar Amplification plc
- Website: www.blackstaramps.com

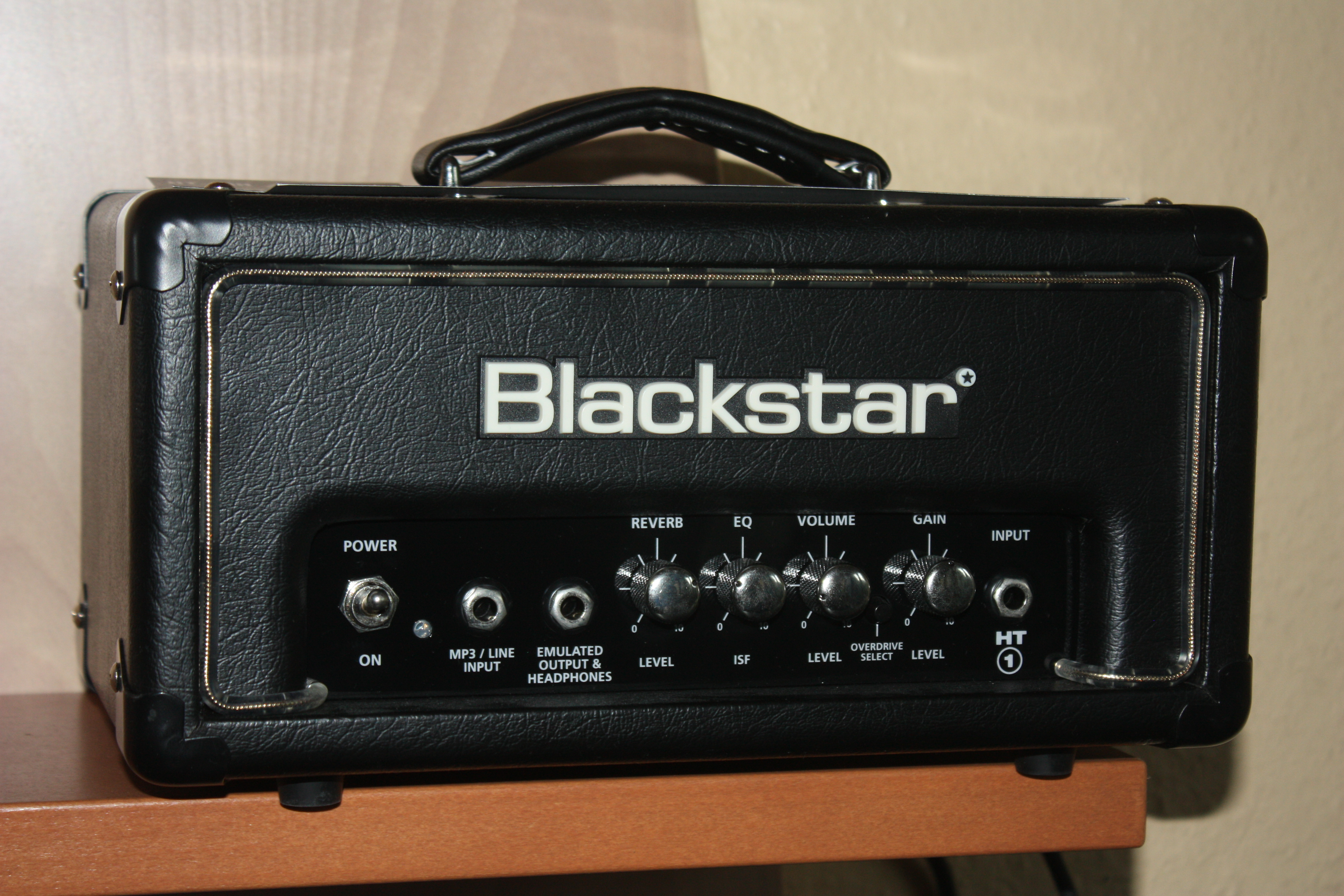
An early Blackstar model

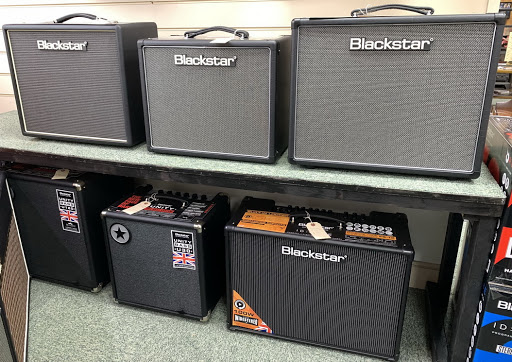
Blackstar Amplifiers in California, United States

Blackstar Amplification is a British company that produces and manufacturers guitar amplifiers and effects units. The company was founded by a group of ex-Marshall employees, most notably Bruce Keir, who became technical Director at Blackstar, and former Chief Design Engineer at Marshall, Ian Robinson. In 2009 the company began operations in the United States. The majority of the research and development for Blackstar is carried out in the UK. Blackstar is endorsed by major artists like Ozzy Osbourne, Neal Schon, Opeth, and Richie Sambora of Bon Jovi. Blackstar has been consistently ranked amongst the best amplification brands by leading guitarists. Bruce Keir died in September 2021 at the age of 60.

== Amplifiers ==
=== Artisan series ===
The Artisan series, designed in the UK, is manufactured in Korea with point-to-point tagboard construction. The dual channel amplifier uses pre-amp valves (most specifically the EF86 pentode) that are associated with smaller Vox amps. The range includes 15, 30, and 100-watt models in both head and combo form. The 15 and 30-watt combos were called "substantial amps that provide substantial tones" in Vintage Guitar.

=== Series One ===
The Blackstar Series One range offers more features than the Artisan range. Some models have four channels. The Blackstar Series One range offers a patented 'ISF' (Infinite Shape Feature), which alters the saturation to sound either 'American' or 'British', or anywhere in between. The range includes 45, 50, 100, and 200-watt models.

=== HT Venue ===
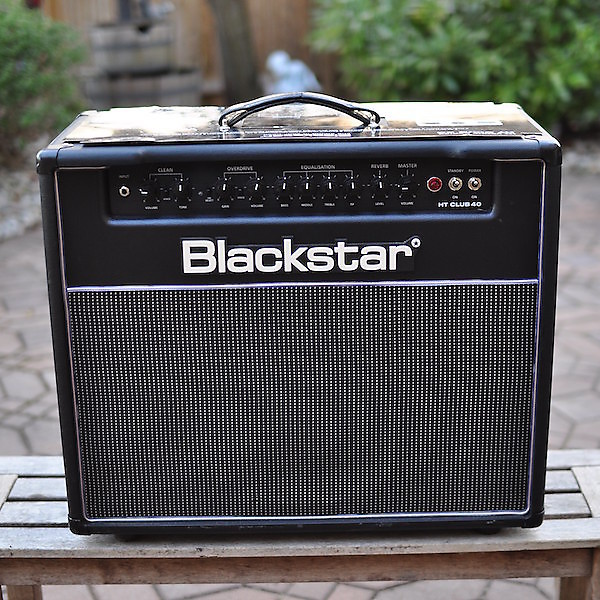
Blackstar 3 HT CLUB 40

Launched in 2010 at the Winter NAMM Show, Blackstar introduced a new line of HT amplifiers. This line is essentially the same as the HT-5 series, but with more power. The models contain 20, 40, 50, 60, and 100 watt amplifiers. All models except the 50W and 100W are available in combo form. The 50W and 100W is head only, and the 20W comes in either head or combo. The HT Venue series also contains three different cabinet sizes: 1×12, 2×12, and 4×12. All speakers in the HT Venue are Celestion. This product range was discontinued in 2017, and replaced by HT Venue MkII.

=== HT Venue MkII ===
Launched in 2017, this product range is a redesign of the original HT Venue series along with modern updates such as USB and D.I. recording via an XLR output. Following more than 3 years of intensive R&D and market research, Blackstar released this update to the award-winning HT Venue line, stating that these products 'take the range to a new level of sonic performance, whilst adding every major enhancement that guitarists have requested; resulting in a massively flexible feature set that is still intuitive and musician-friendly.' These products were well received during the initial release, and have gone on to win numerous awards across various publications.

=== HT Metal ===
Blackstar's alternative range to the HT Venue range - clearly designed for Metal music and play-styles. Heads come in 1, 5, and 100 watt formats, and 1, 5, and 60 watt in combo format. These amps carry the signature ISF and emulated output of Blackstar amps. The 1 and 5 watt formats have 2 channels, while the 60 and 100 watt formats have 3 channels. These amps boast "extreme gain and tone", and are "Voiced for Metal- Hundreds of hours of technical development and focussed listening tests have resulted in the ultimate gigging metal head." This line of amplifiers was released at Musicmesse 2013. This product range was discontinued in 2017.

=== ID:Series ===
Blackstar's line of digital programmable amplifiers are available in 60 and 100 watt head format and 15, 30, 40, 60 and 120 watt combo format. Along with the ISF and Emulated output, they also possess strong digital preamps with 128 unique storage banks to store settings.

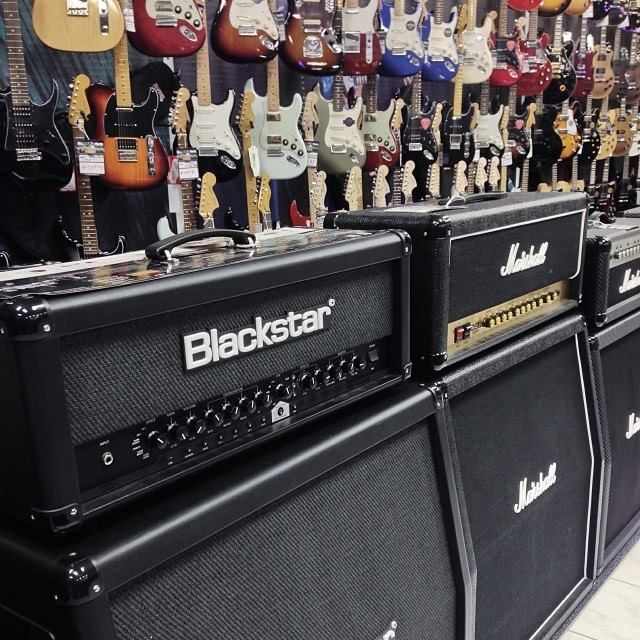
Blackstar amplifiers in a store in London, UK

=== HT-5 and HT-1 ===
One of Blackstar's smaller amplifiers at 5 watts, it is effectively an HT Dual pedal packaged as an amplifier. Having ISF and EQ features in common with some of the pedals, the HT-5 also includes an emulated output to provide a valve sound for recording without the need for a microphone. The HT-1 is essentially a 1 watt version of the HT-5, and does not need being biased after a tubes (ECC83 and ECC82) exchange. It is also available in head-cab format, with a matching 60 watt cabinet.

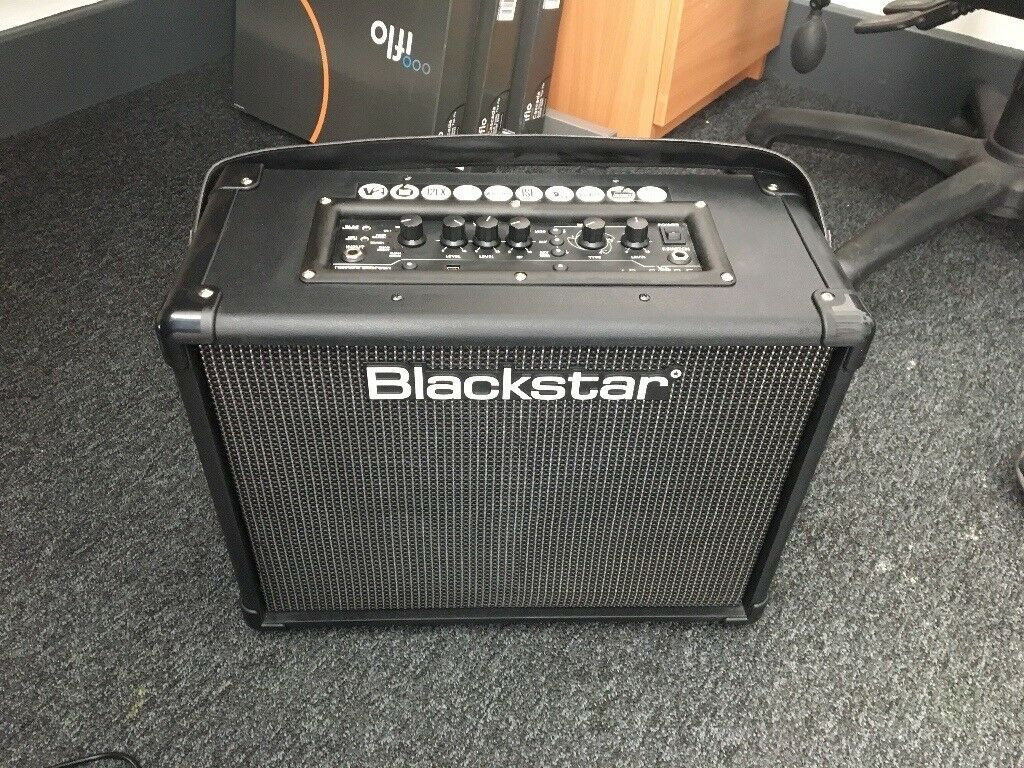
Blackstar ID Core 40 V2

=== Fly 3 ===
The Fly 3 is a series of 3-watt compact amplifiers powered by batteries or an external supply. It is available in three types: for electric guitar featuring switchable distortion, ISF (see above) and digital echo; acoustic guitar with switchable EQ and delay; and bass with sub-bass control and a compressor. All three versions can be used with a stereo extension speaker or for 'MP3 playback'.

=== St. James ===
The St. James was released in 2022 and is part of the current lineup of Blackstar Amplification amps.

It is powered by either 6L6 or EL34 power amp valves, allowing players to choose which sound suits them better.It comes in 100 watts or 50 watts versions, both powers made as combos or as heads (that also features matching cabinets).

The amp's tone is an approach to a more classic rock kind of sound, bringing characteristics of classic british sounds. The St. James amp also features a balanced output with a Cab Rig speaker emulation, and it can be adjusted using the company's Blackstar Architect app.

== Effect pedals ==
Blackstar produces guitar pedals for boost, overdrive, distortion, distx, modulation, reverb, delay, dual and metal. Some of the pedals incorporate valves (tubes) in the electronics, the drive pedals incorporate Blackstars ISF feature. Like the HT-5, some of the pedals have an emulated speaker output for direct recording.
