= Music for the People (The Enemy album) =

Studio album by The Enemy
- Released: 27 April 2009
- Recorded: 2008
- Genres: Indie rock; punk rock
- Length: 46:46
- Label: Warner Bros.
- Producers: Mike Crossey; Matt Terry

The Enemy chronology
B-Sides (2008)	Music for the People (2009)	Streets in the Sky (2012)

Singles from Music for the People
- 1. "No Time for Tears" Released: 13 April 2009; 2. "Sing When You're in Love" Released: 22 June 2009; 3. "Be Somebody" Released: 28 September 2009

Music for the People is the second studio album by Coventry-based indie rock band The Enemy, which was released 27 April 2009. It entered the UK charts at number two, losing out on the number one spot to Bob Dylan's Together Through Life.

== Background and recording ==
Following a short break, the trio spent the majority of autumn 2008 recording in rural Wales at Monnow Valley Studio in South Wales with producer Jim Anderson and Mike Crossey. Whilst the plan was to capitalise on the buzz from their debut, the band didn't rush the sessions. "We totally took our time," Clarke stated.

In early 2009, The Enemy completed the recording of the album. On their official Myspace blog, the band described the album as a "big step forward", deciding to "go back to basics with the recording and do it all on tape rather than computers which is how the vast majority of modern records are made, and as a result it sounds huge, like a proper old school rock record". They also described the album as having a more "raw and punkier sound", whilst Clarke noted that, although he was aiming to address various issues with the album's lyrics, the band took a less organised approach in writing them;

I don't think my politics have changed. We've just got a broader perspective... We only ever wrote [lyrics] about the world around us. I can only think of Gallows and Jon McClure with us. There's a place for what we say, but it's down to the individual lyricist. You can't find an issue for the sake of it. And you need colourful bands like MGMT and Klaxons anyway, particularly in a recession, when you want escapism... I've never tried to write about a particular subject, I'd be terrible if I did. I don't even write my lyrics down. If they're any good, you'll remember them. We used to write in the car on the way to rehearsals, just to maximise the time. And, on this album, it was doing it in stolen moments between promo.

== Release ==
The lead single, "No Time For Tears", was debuted on BBC Radio 1 on 17 February 2009, including an interview with the band discussing tour dates and their "new sound". The single was officially released on 13 April, with the album following a fortnight later on 27 April. As part of the promotion for the album, the band played a number of gigs in small, intimate venues throughout February 2009, in Lincoln, York, Dundee, Wakefield, Tunbridge Wells and Corby. The song entered the UK Singles Chart at number 16 on 19 April 2009, marking the band's fourth UK top 20 single, selling 12,606 units in its first week.

The video for the second single, "Sing When You're in Love", was debuted on T4 on 9 May 2009, and released on 22 June.

The third single, "Be Somebody", was used as theme music for FIFA 10 by EA Sports and in ITV's FA Cup football coverage until 2012. It was played pre-match at the Ricoh Arena by Coventry City.

== Critical reception ==
Professional ratings
Aggregate scores
Source	Rating
Metacritic	55/100
Review scores
Source	Rating
AllMusic	2/5 stars
Drowned in Sound	2/10
entertainment.ie	2/5 stars
The Guardian	3/5 stars
The Independent	2/5 stars
The List	2/5
musicOMH	1/5 stars
PopMatters	4/10
Spin	4/10

The album received mixed reviews scoring 4.5/10 at aggregator website AnyDecentMusic?, and 55/100 at Metacritic. John Earls of Planet Sound saw the LP as a progression from the band's debut album, but found fault with the lyrical content.

The album was pilloried for its alleged plagiarism. Commenting on the opening track "Elephant Song", Drowned in Sound noticed its similarity to Led Zeppelin's "Kashmir". "Last Goodbye" and its use of strings was compared to The Verve. The chorus of "Last Goodbye" also bears a striking resemblance to Blur's "The Universal". "Nation of Checkout Girls" was also derided for sounding identical to "Common People" by Pulp, while another song on their album "Don't Break The Red Tape" has also been criticised for sounding similar to "London Calling" by The Clash. The BBC described the album as "terrible", asking, "What did the people ever do to deserve this?" Drowned in Sound concluded: "Never has reaching the end of a record been met with such a massive sigh of relief".

In The Independent, Andy Gill called the album's title "sinister...as if all other music were somehow against "the people" (whoever they are); or as if the band's modest creations had been officially sanctioned as fit for our ears". He was sceptical of the album's political content, writing that "I'm instinctively suspicious about this kind of eagerly populist music, which invariably hides naked commercial ambitions behind a facade of oppositional posturing".

== Track listing ==
1. "Elephant Song" – 4:39
2. "No Time for Tears" – 5:15
3. "51st State" – 2:30
4. "Sing When You're in Love" – 3:37
5. "Last Goodbye" – 4:52
6. "Nation of Checkout Girls" – 3:14
7. "Be Somebody" – 3:04
8. "Don't Break the Red Tape" – 3:42
9. "Keep Losing" – 4:35
10. "Silver Spoon" – 11:17 (ends at 5:16, hidden track begins at 8:54)

=== Bonus tracks ===
1. "A New England" (Billy Bragg cover) – 2:51
2. "Hey Hey, My My (Into the Black)" – 2:54
3. "Keep Losing" (strings version) – 4:32
4. "Away from Here (live at Union Chapel)" – 3:28

=== iTunes bonus tracks ===
11. "This Song Is About You (live at Glasgow Barrowlands Ballroom)" – 5:33
12. "We'll Live And Die in These Towns (live at Glasgow Barrowlands Ballroom)" – 3:00

=== Writers ===
All songs were written by Tom Clarke.

== Charts ==
=== Weekly charts ===
Chart (2009)	Peak position
Irish Albums (IRMA)	41
Scottish Albums (Official Charts)	2
UK Albums (Official Charts)	2

=== Year-end charts ===
Chart (2009)	Position
UK Albums (OCC)	170
