= The Ripps =

English rock band

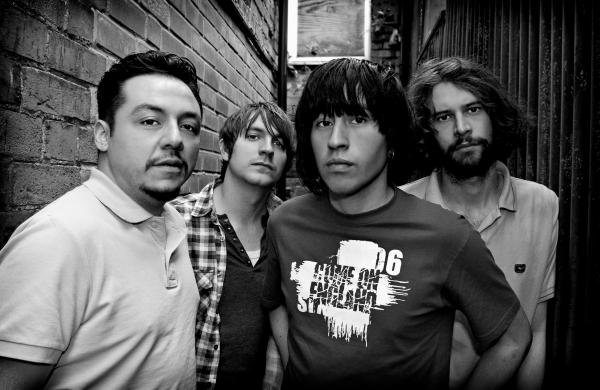
- The Ripps in 2010

Background information
- Origin: Coventry, England
- Genres: Indie rock; pop punk; alternative rock
- Years active: 2003–present
- Members: Patch Lagunas; Raul Lagunas; Alan Ferguson; Phil Cox; Terry Muttitt; Lolly Macintosh

The Ripps are an English rock band formed in Coventry in 2003. The band currently consists of Patch Lagunas (vocals/rhythm guitar), Raul Lagunas (lead guitar/backing vocals), Alan Ferguson (bass), Phil Cox (drums) Terry Muttitt (keys/synth) and Lolly Macintosh. Until 2009, the band were a three piece featuring drummer Rachel Butt.

== History ==
The Ripps were formed by brothers Patch and Raul Lagunas, whose parents were political activists that escaped political persecution from General Pinochet in Chile. Their debut single "Vandals" was released in 2006, followed by their debut album Long Live the Ripps. "Vandals" was praised by Lianne Steinberg of Drowned in Sound. Tom Inkelaar of Zap! Bang! gave Long Live the Ripps a mixed to positive review, calling it "derivative but more importantly energetic, fun and throwaway in the best way."

Andy R. of Punktastic called the album "quintessentially British-sounding, with a real nostalgic taste for the early-Eighties punk flavours of The Buzzcocks." Spin also compared them to the Buzzcocks, saying the Ripps were "so English they made Arctic Monkeys sound like Dwight Yoakam."

In 2007, the band released the single "Holiday". Their 2007 single "Loco" had a mixed reception, earning praise from Dan Martin of NME, and Phil Udell of Hot Press. Ben Yates of Drowned In Sound was more critical of the song, calling it "embarrassing". Cam Lindsay of Exclaim! said that the band's "bubblegum scuzz is adorable and undeniably yummy, like a wad of fresh Hubba Bubba."

In 2009, Alan Ferguson, Phil Cox, Terry Muttitt and Lolly McIntosh to complete a new line-up. The band were invited to support The Specials on their UK tour and to play for the British Embassy in Kuwait in October 2009. Throughout the summer of 2010, they achieved significant airplay on BBC Coventry and Warwickshire and were featured on television for the BBC and Channel 5. In 2011, they had recorded new material, ready for release by the middle of the year. While in the same year, they wrote and performed the soundtrack for the play Too Much Pressure at the Belgrade Theatre, writing the music.

== Discography ==
=== Albums ===
- Long Live the Ripps (2007)
- Heartbreaks and Hangovers (2012)

=== Singles ===
- "Loco" (2007)
- "Vandals" (2007)
- "Holiday" (2007)
