= We'll Live and Die in These Towns =

Studio album by The Enemy
- Released: 9 July 2007
- Recorded: 2006–2007
- Genres: Indie rock; punk rock
- Length: 37:11
- Label: Warner Bros.
- Producers: Barny; Owen Morris; Matt Terry

The Enemy chronology
We'll Live and Die in These Towns (2007)	B-Sides (2008)

Singles from We'll Live and Die in These Towns
- 1. "40 Days and 40 Nights" Released: 6 November 2006; 2. "It's Not OK" Released: 5 February 2007; 3. "Away from Here" Released: 16 April 2007; 4. "Had Enough" Released: 25 June 2007; 5. "You're Not Alone" Released: 17 September 2007; 6. "We'll Live and Die in These Towns" Released: 3 December 2007; 7. "This Song (a.k.a. This Song is About You)" Released: 17 March 2008

We'll Live and Die in These Towns is the debut album of British indie rock band The Enemy, released on 9 July 2007. It entered the UK Albums Chart at number one.

The album reached number 75 in the UK end of year chart selling around 222,000 copies in 2007. In February 2008, it was given platinum certification meaning sales of over 300,000 copies.

A low-quality version of the full album was leaked on 3 July 2007, containing both demo and non-album versions of particular songs.

The song "Aggro", which appears on the album, is featured in the video game Guitar Hero World Tour.

The songs "Had Enough" and "Away from Here" are featured in the 2012 racing video game Forza Horizon.

== Reception ==
Professional ratings
Aggregate scores
Source	Rating
Metacritic	61/100
Review scores
Source	Rating
Allmusic	2.5/5 stars
Drowned in Sound	(4/10)
Gigwise.com	2.5/5 stars
The Guardian	3/5 stars
NME	(8/10)
Uncut	2/5 stars
Yahoo! Music UK	(6/10)
Stereology	(8/10)

Critical response to We'll Live and Die in These Towns tended toward the positive. At Metacritic, which assigns a normalized rating out of 100 to reviews from mainstream critics, the album has received an average score of 61, based on 11 reviews.

== Track listing ==
1. "Aggro" – 3:25
2. "Away from Here" – 3:02
3. "Pressure" – 3:18
4. "Had Enough" - 2:39
5. "We'll Live and Die in These Towns" – 3:54
6. "You're Not Alone" – 3:44
7. "It's Not OK" – 3:35
8. "Technodanceaphobic" – 2:34
9. "40 Days and 40 Nights" – 3:36
10. "This Song" – 4:25
11. "Happy Birthday Jane" – 2:59

Bonus tracks:

1. "Five Years" (David Bowie cover) – 4:31
2. "Fear Killed the Youth of Our Nation" – 3:31

=== Writers ===
All songs were written by The Enemy.

=== Signing session ===
On 9 July, the day of release of the album, the band played a special set at HMV Oxford Street in London and in Coventry.

The album went to number one on 15 July.

== Charts ==
=== Weekly charts ===
Chart (2007)	Peak position
Irish Albums (IRMA)	63
Scottish Albums (Official Charts)	1
UK Albums (Official Charts)	1

=== Year-end charts ===
Chart (2007)	Position
UK Albums (OCC)	75
Chart (2008)	Position
UK Albums (OCC)	95
