= Tom Clarke (musician) =

British musician (born 1986)

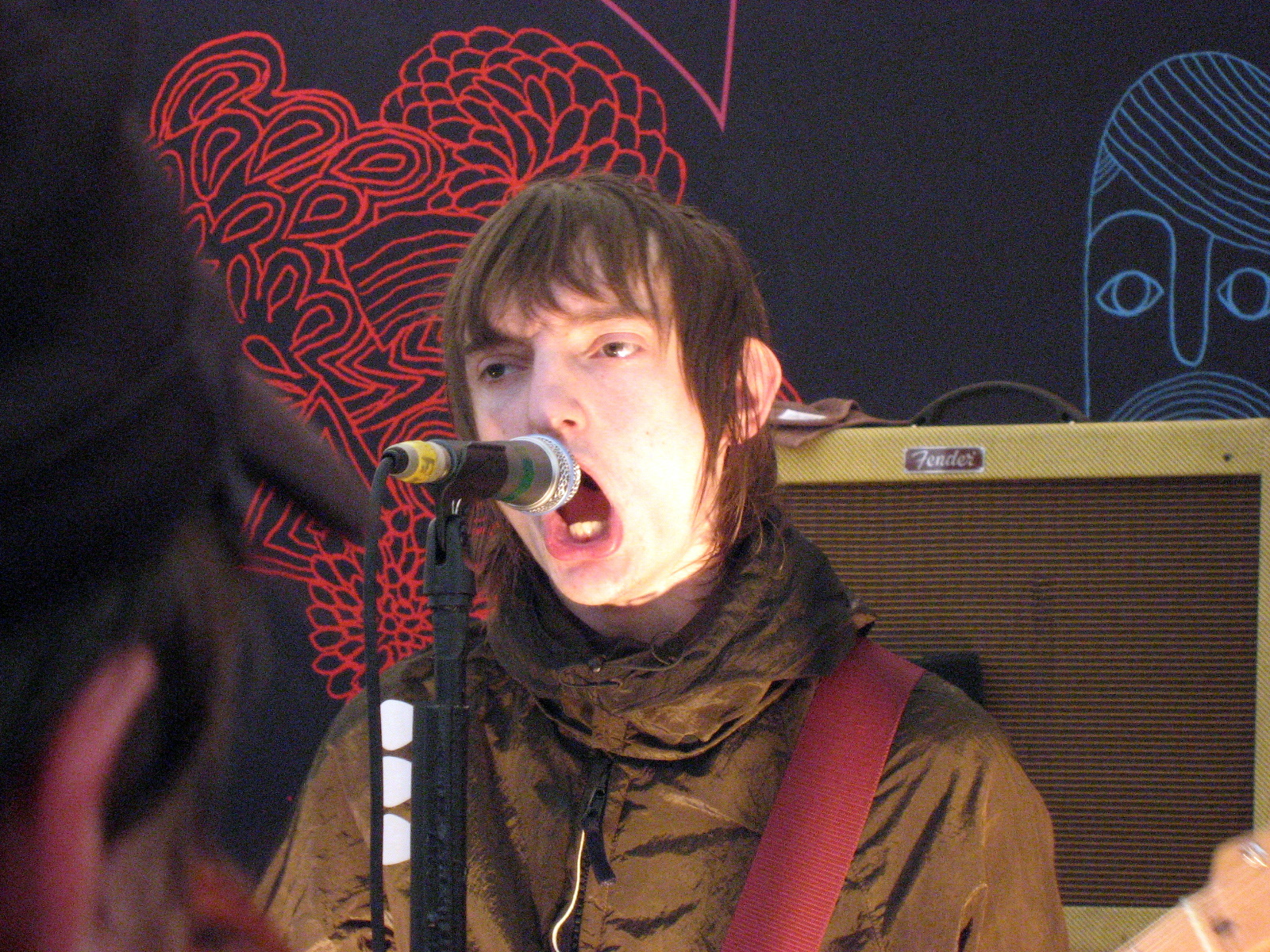
- Clarke in 2007

Background information
- Born: 11 March 1986 (age 40); Birmingham, England
- Genres: Indie rock; punk rock; alternative rock
- Occupations: Musician; songwriter; multi-instrumentalist
- Instruments: Vocals; guitar; piano; strings
- Years active: 2006–present
- Labels: WMG; Stiff (UK)
- Member of: The Enemy
- Website: www.theenemyband.com

Tom Clarke (born 11 March 1986) is an English multi-instrumentalist known as the lead vocalist of the British indie rock band The Enemy.

Clarke has performed on all of the band's albums, playing guitar, piano, and strings on We'll Live and Die in These Towns. He appeared as a guest on Noel Fielding's team on the first episode of series 23 of Never Mind the Buzzcocks.

== Personal life ==
In January 2010, Gigwise reported that Clarke had acquired a "ridiculous farm" and was taking a short break from music to decorate. Clarke stated that the band was rehearsing and writing new Enemy material prolifically.

In October 2016, he finished his last Enemy gig by proposing to his unsuspecting girlfriend and tour DJ Kate Frost.

Clarke was diagnosed with autism in his early to mid-30s.

== Gumball Rally ==
In 2009, Clarke participated in the Gumball 3000 Rally. Monster Energy, one of the rally sponsors, awarded Clarke and his co-driver and fellow band member Tom Boddy the 2009 Monster Energy Award for Bad Behaviour.

== Race for Heroes ==
On 27 February 2010, Clarke participated in the "Race for Heroes" alongside stars of British motorsport and British soldiers to support the Help for Heroes organization. The six-hour endurance race aimed to raise money and awareness for the charity.

== XFM controversy ==
In September 2007, Alex Zane, presenter of the XFM Breakfast show, broadcast a statement declaring that the band would no longer be played on his show. After playing their single "You're Not Alone" for seven seconds, he explained that altercations between himself and the band (notably Tom Clarke) over a television interview had led him to make this decision. He claimed that Clarke had said "disgusting, offensive, hateful things." However, during the XFM Review of 2008, presenters Sunta Templeton and Matt Dyson mentioned that the band and Zane had reconciled, just after playing their record "Away from Here."

== Equipment ==
During live performances with The Enemy, Clarke plays a green Fender Telecaster, equipped with an aftermarket Seymour Duncan bridge pickup.

Clarke uses a Blackstar Amplification Artist 30 model amplifier and is listed as a confirmed artist by Blackstar. He has also appeared on the official Blackstar Amplification YouTube channel, where he discusses the Studio 10 6L6 model.
