= List of schools in Coventry =

This is a list of schools in Coventry, West Midlands, England.

== Government-funded schools ==
=== Primary schools ===
- Alderman's Green Primary School, Alderman's Green
- Aldermoor Farm Primary School, Stoke Aldermoor
- All Saints' CE Primary School, Stoke
- All Souls' RC Primary School, Chapelfields
- Allesley Hall Primary School, Allesley
- Allesley Primary School, Allesley
- Broad Heath Community Primary School, Edgwick
- Cannon Park Primary School, Cannon Park
- Charter Academy, Canley
- Christ The King RC Primary School, Coundon
- Clifford Bridge Academy, Binley
- Corpus Christi RC School, Ernesford Grange
- Coundon Primary School, Coundon
- Courthouse Green Primary School, Courthouse Green
- Earlsdon Primary School, Earlsdon
- Eastern Green Junior School, Eastern Green
- Edgewick Community Primary School, Foleshill
- Ernesford Grange Primary School, Ernesford Grange
- Finham Primary School, Finham
- Frederick Bird Academy, Hillfields
- Good Shepherd RC School, Foleshill
- Gosford Park Primary School, Stoke
- Grange Farm Primary School, Stivichall
- Grangehurst Primary School, Longford
- Hearsall Community Academy, Earlsdon
- Henley Green Primary School, Wyken
- Hill Farm Academy, Radford
- Holbrook Primary School, Holbrooks
- Hollyfast Primary School, Coundon
- Holy Family RC Primary School, Holbrooks
- Howes Community Primary School, Cheylesmore
- John Gulson Primary School, Hillfields
- John Shelton Community Primary School, Holbrooks
- Joseph Cash Primary School, Radford
- Keresley Grange Primary School, Brownshill Green
- Leigh CE Academy, Tile Hill
- Limbrick Wood Primary School, Tile Hill
- Little Heath Primary School, Courthouse Green
- Longford Park Primary School, Longford
- Manor Park Primary School, Cheylesmore
- Moat House Primary School, Wood End
- Moseley Primary School, Coundon
- Mount Nod Primary School, Eastern Green
- Our Lady of the Assumption RC Primary School, Tile Hill
- Park Hill Primary School, Eastern Green
- Parkgate Primary School, Holbrooks
- Pearl Hyde Community Primary School, Clifford Park
- Potters Green Primary School, Potters Green
- Radford Primary Academy, Radford
- Ravensdale Primary School, Walsgrave
- Richard Lee Primary School, Wyken
- Sacred Heart RC Primary School, Stoke
- St Andrew's CE Infant School, Eastern Green
- St Anne's RC Primary School, Willenhall
- St Augustine's RC Primary School, Radford
- St Bartholomew's CE Academy, Binley
- St Christopher Primary School, Allesley
- St Elizabeth's RC Primary School, Foleshill
- St Gregory's RC Primary School, Wyken
- St John Fisher RC Primary School, Wyken
- St John Vianney RC Primary School, Mount Nod
- St John's CE Academy, Allesley Park
- St Laurence's CE Primary School, Foleshill
- St Mary and St Benedict RC Primary School, Hillfields
- St Osburg's RC Primary School, Coundon
- St Patrick's RC Primary School, Wood End
- St Thomas More RC Primary School, Stivichall
- SS Peter and Paul RC Primary School, Walsgrave
- Seva School, Wyken
- Sidney Stringer Primary Academy, Hillfields
- Southfields Primary School, Hillfields
- Sowe Valley Primary School, Binley
- Spon Gate Primary School, Spon End
- Stanton Bridge Primary School, Edgwick
- Stivichall Primary School, Stivichall
- Stoke Heath Primary School, Stoke Heath
- Stoke Primary School, Stoke
- Stretton CE Academy, Willenhall
- Templars Primary School, Tile Hill
- Walsgrave CE Academy, Walsgrave
- Whitley Abbey Primary School, Whitley
- Whitmore Park Primary School, Brownshill Green
- Whittle Academy, Bell Green
- Whoberley Hall Primary School, Whoberley
- Willenhall Community Primary School, Willenhall
- Wyken Croft Primary School, Wyken

=== Secondary schools ===
- Barr's Hill School, Radford
- Bishop Ullathorne RC School, Finham
- Blue Coat CE School, Stoke
- Caludon Castle School, Wyken
- Cardinal Newman RC School, Keresley
- Cardinal Wiseman RC School, Potters Green
- Coundon Court, Coundon
- Eden Girls' School, Foleshill
- Ernesford Grange Community Academy, Ernesford Grange
- Finham Park School, Finham
- Finham Park 2, Tile Hill
- Foxford Community School, Longford
- Grace Academy, Potters Green
- Lyng Hall School, Edgwick
- President Kennedy School, Holbrooks
- Seva School, Wyken
- Sidney Stringer Academy, Hillfields
- Stoke Park School, Stoke
- West Coventry Academy, Tile Hill
- The Westwood Academy, Canley
- Whitley Academy, Whitley
- WMG Academy for Young Engineers, Coventry

=== Special and alternative schools ===
- Baginton Fields School, Willenhall
- Castle Wood School, Wood End
- Corley Academy, Corley, Warwickshire (Note: This school is located in Warwickshire, but is for pupils from Coventry)
- Coventry Extended Learning Centre, Wyken
- Hospital Education Service, Brownshill Green
- Kingsbury Academy, Coundon
- Riverbank Academy, Whitley
- Sherbourne Fields School, Coundon
- Tiverton School, Coundon
- The Warwickshire Academy, Keresley (Note: This school is located in Coventry, but is for pupils from Warwickshire)
- Woodfield School, Gibbet Hill

=== Further education ===
- City College Coventry, Hillfields
- Henley College Coventry, Bell Green
- Hereward College, Tile Hill

== Independent schools ==
=== Primary and preparatory schools ===
- Bablake Junior & Pre-prep School, Coundon
- King Henry VIII Preparatory School, Earlsdon
- Lote Tree Primary School, Foleshill

=== Senior and all-through schools ===
- Bablake School, Coundon
- King Henry VIII School, Earlsdon
- The National Mathematics and Science College, Westwood Heath
- Pattison College, Stoke Green

=== Special and alternative schools ===
- Summit School, Hillfields
