= CV postcode area =

Postcode area within the United Kingdom

Coventry
- Postcode area
- Coordinates: 52.372°N 1.502°W
- Country: United Kingdom
- Postcode area: CV
- Postcode area name: Coventry
- Post towns: 11
- Postcode districts: 24
- Postcode sectors: 104
- Postcodes (live): 20,320
- Postcodes (total): 28,094
- Statistics as at May 2020

The CV postcode area, also known as the Coventry postcode area, is a group of 24 postcode districts in central England, within eleven post towns. These cover the eastern part of the West Midlands county (including Coventry), most of Warwickshire (including Atherstone, Bedworth, Kenilworth, Leamington Spa, Nuneaton, Rugby, Shipston-on-Stour, Southam, Stratford-upon-Avon and Warwick), a part of west Leicestershire and a very small part of Northamptonshire.

The postcode areas CV1 to CV6 incorporate the city of Coventry and its contiguous suburbs, with CV7 covering several rural and suburban villages to the immediate west and north of the city (where Coventry remains the post town), i.e., the eastern portion of Solihull Borough and the southernmost areas of the Nuneaton & Bedworth District.

CV8 to CV47 covers all other post towns in the postcode area, to the north, south, and east of Coventry (full coverage listed below).

== Coverage ==
The approximate coverage of the postcode districts:

Postcode district	Post town	Coverage	Local authority area(s)
CV1	COVENTRY	Coventry C (Coventry City Centre, Gosford Green, Hillfields, Spon End, Bishopsgate Green, Coventry University)	Coventry
CV2	COVENTRY	Coventry NE (Walsgrave, Wyken, Stoke, Bell Green, Wood End, Potters Green, Aldermans Green, Clifford Park, Woodway Park)	Coventry
CV3	COVENTRY	Coventry SE (Binley, Whitley, Willenhall, Cheylesmore, Styvechale, Finham, Fenside, Stoke Aldermoor, Green Lane, Ernesford Grange, Binley Woods)	Coventry, Rugby, Warwick
CV4	COVENTRY	Coventry SW (Tile Hill, Canley, Cannon Park, Lime Tree Park, Gibbet Hill, Westwood Heath, University of Warwick)	Coventry
CV5	COVENTRY	Coventry NW (Allesley, Allesley Park, Allesley Green, Earlsdon, Eastern Green, Whoberley, Chapelfields, Mount Nod, Brownshill Green, Millison's Wood)	Coventry, Solihull
CV6	COVENTRY	Coventry N (Holbrooks, Coundon, Radford, Upper Foleshill, Longford, Rowley's Green, Courthouse Green, Whitmore Park), Hawkesbury	Coventry, Nuneaton and Bedworth
CV7	COVENTRY	Exhall, Ash Green, Keresley, Meriden, Balsall Common, Berkswell, Corley, Arley, Ansty, Shilton, Fillongley	Nuneaton and Bedworth, North Warwickshire, Coventry, Rugby, Solihull
CV8	COVENTRY	Wolston, Ryton-on-Dunsmore	Warwick, Rugby
CV8	KENILWORTH	Kenilworth, Baginton, Bubbenhall, Burton Green, Brandon, Stoneleigh, Ashow	Warwick, Rugby
CV9	ATHERSTONE	Atherstone, Mancetter, Grendon, Baddesley Ensor, Baxterley, Hurley, Witherley, Wood End, Twycross, Orton On The Hill, Ridge Lane Village	North Warwickshire, Hinckley and Bosworth
CV10	NUNEATON	Nuneaton N & W (Weddington, Stockingford, Camp Hill, Galley Common, Grove Farm, Whittleford, Chapel End, Bermuda Village, Old Hill Top), Caldecote, Fenny Drayton, Hartshill, Ansley, Astley, Oldbury, Ridge Lane	Nuneaton and Bedworth, North Warwickshire
CV11	NUNEATON	Nuneaton C & E (town centre, Abbey Green, St Nicolas Park, Horeston Grange, Attleborough, Whitestone, New Hill Top, Chilvers Coton, Caldwell), Burton Hastings, Bramcote	Nuneaton and Bedworth, Rugby, Hinckley and Bosworth
CV12	BEDWORTH	Bedworth (except Exhall and Ash Green), Bulkington	Nuneaton and Bedworth
CV13	NUNEATON	Barlestone, Barton in the Beans, Bilstone, Cadeby, Carlton, Congerstone, Dadlington, Fenny Drayton, Higham on the Hill, Market Bosworth, Nailstone, Odstone, Osbaston, Shackerstone, Shenton, Stoke Golding, Sutton Cheney, Upton, Wellsborough	Hinckley and Bosworth
CV21	RUGBY	Rugby (north), Brownsover	Rugby
CV22	RUGBY	Rugby (south), Bilton, Cawston, Dunchurch	Rugby
CV23	RUGBY	Thurlaston, Princethorpe, Stretton-on-Dunsmore, Birdingbury, Brinklow, Long Lawford, Clifton upon Dunsmore, Stretton-under-Fosse, Monks Kirby, Kilsby	Rugby, West Northamptonshire
CV31	LEAMINGTON SPA	Leamington Spa (south), Sydenham, Whitnash, Radford Semele	Warwick
CV32	LEAMINGTON SPA	Leamington Spa (north), Lillington, Cubbington, Milverton, Campion Hills	Warwick
CV33	LEAMINGTON SPA	Harbury and surrounding villages	Warwick, Stratford-on-Avon
CV34	WARWICK	Warwick, Heathcote	Warwick
CV35	WARWICK	Wellesbourne, Gaydon, Kineton and surrounding villages	Warwick, Stratford-on-Avon
CV36	SHIPSTON-ON-STOUR	Shipston-on-Stour and surrounding villages	Stratford-on-Avon
CV37	STRATFORD-UPON-AVON	Stratford-upon-Avon and surrounding villages	Stratford-on-Avon
CV47	SOUTHAM	Southam and surrounding villages	Stratford-on-Avon

The CV47 district was formed in 1999 from parts of the CV23 and CV33 districts.

== Map ==
CV postcode area map, showing postcode districts in red and post towns in grey text, with links to nearby B, DE, GL, LE, NN, OX and WR postcode areas.

== See also ==
- List of postcode areas in the United Kingdom
- Centre points of the United Kingdom
- Postcode Address File
