= Cardinal Wiseman Catholic School, Coventry =

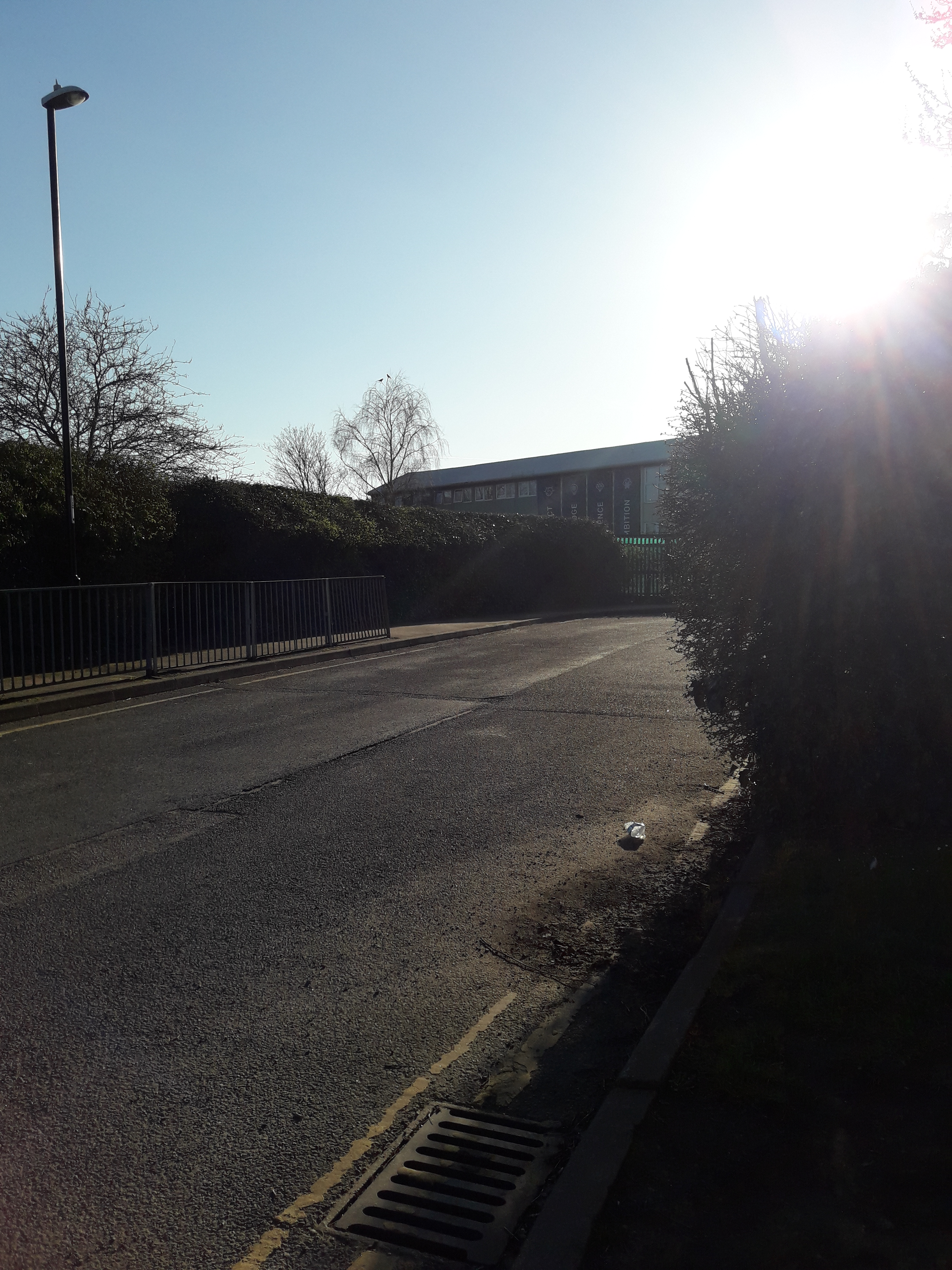

Location
- Potters Green Road; Coventry, West Midlands, CV2 2AJ; England; 52.4357°N 1.4520°W

Information
- Type: Academy
- Motto: OMNIA PRO CHRISTO (Everything For Christ)
- Religious affiliation: Roman Catholic
- Established: 1598
- Locale: Potters Green
- Local authority: Coventry City Council
- Department for Education URN: 141992 Tables
- Ofsted: Reports
- Principal: L. Burtonwood
- Gender: Coeducational
- Age: 11 to 18
- Enrolment: 1,356 (approx.)
- Website: cardinalwiseman.coventry.sch.uk

Cardinal Wiseman Catholic School is a coeducational secondary school and sixth form situated in Potters Green, Coventry, England. It is part of the Romero Catholic Academy from ages 11–18. It was established in 1598, but merged in the Romero Multi Academy Company (MAC) on 1 August 2015.

== Staffing ==
As of the 13th June 2025, the following roles are taken by the following staff members:

=== Leadership Team ===
Principal: Ms L Burtonwood

Senior Assistant Principal: Mrs A Hirons

Senior Leadership Team: Miss K Alton, Miss S Armstrong, Mr R Kingshott, Mr A Pearse, Mr M Lambert, Mr H Forinton, Ms L Morgan, Miss A Harkin.

== Feeder primary schools ==
The school's feeder primary schools, all of which are part of the Romero Catholic Academy, are:

- Corpus Christi, Ernesford Grange
- Good Shepherd, Courthouse Green
- Sacred Heart, Stoke
- St Gregory's, Wyken
- St John Fisher, Wyken
- St Patrick's, Wood End
- SS Peter and Paul, Walsgrave

== School visits ==
=== Charles, Prince of Wales ===
Charles, Prince of Wales visited the school in April 2008. He was interested in the school's farm and how the pupils looked after the animals. The school won the DCSF Sustainable Schools Award in 2009. As of July 2017, the farm was being shut down due to fewer pupils not choosing to participate in the animal care subjects as well as the new management's focus on academic subjects.

=== Ed Sheeran ===
Ahead of his concert at the Coventry Building Society Arena, Ed Sheeran visited the school as part of a music project across Coventry. He introduced Access to Music Industry and Your Voice, which he launched through his Ed Sheeran Foundation (ESF) in partnership with Coventry Music, part of Coventry City Council, and St Giles Trust.

== Malawi links ==
Cardinal Wiseman School has been sending students to Malawi for over a decade and has established links with a number of schools, most notably Bunda School. Bunda is on track to becoming a sustainable school and with the help of Cardinal Wiseman staff, students and contributors to the Cardinal Wiseman Malawi Trust hopes to become an advice hub for other schools in Malawi. The Trust has given much help and support to Bunda over the years and also to Kasina Health Clinic.

== Diversity ==
Cardinal Wiseman School has 40 languages spoken, according to Coventry Live. The school has an 'Ethnic Minority Achievement Services' (EMAS for short) that provides a course for young people. The EMAS course can give a bespoke course for refugees and asylum seekers.

== Notable alumni ==
- Sharon Maguire (born 1963), film director
- Craig Reid (born 1965), footballer
- Jacquie Beltrao (born 1965), sports presenter and journalist
- James Quinn (born 1974), footballer
- Sinead Matthews (born 1980), actress
- Luke McCormick (born 1983), footballer
- Liam Tamne (born 1985), actor and singer
- Emma McGann (born 1990), singer-songwriter and musician
- James Collins (born 1990), footballer
- Jordan Mackampa (born 1994), musician

== School Bus Routes ==
These specialised bus routes are variants of its original routes; operated all by National Express Coventry however open to the general public, including

- Bus Route 21S (variant of Bus Route 21) Cardinal Wiseman – Willenhall
- Bus Route 8B (variant of Bus Route 8) Cardinal Wiseman – Allesley Park
- Bus Route 7B (variant of Bus Route 7) Cardinal Wiseman – Brownshill Green

== See also ==
- List of schools in Coventry
- Secondary school
- School
