= West Midlands bus route 21 =

Bus route in Coventry, England

Route 21

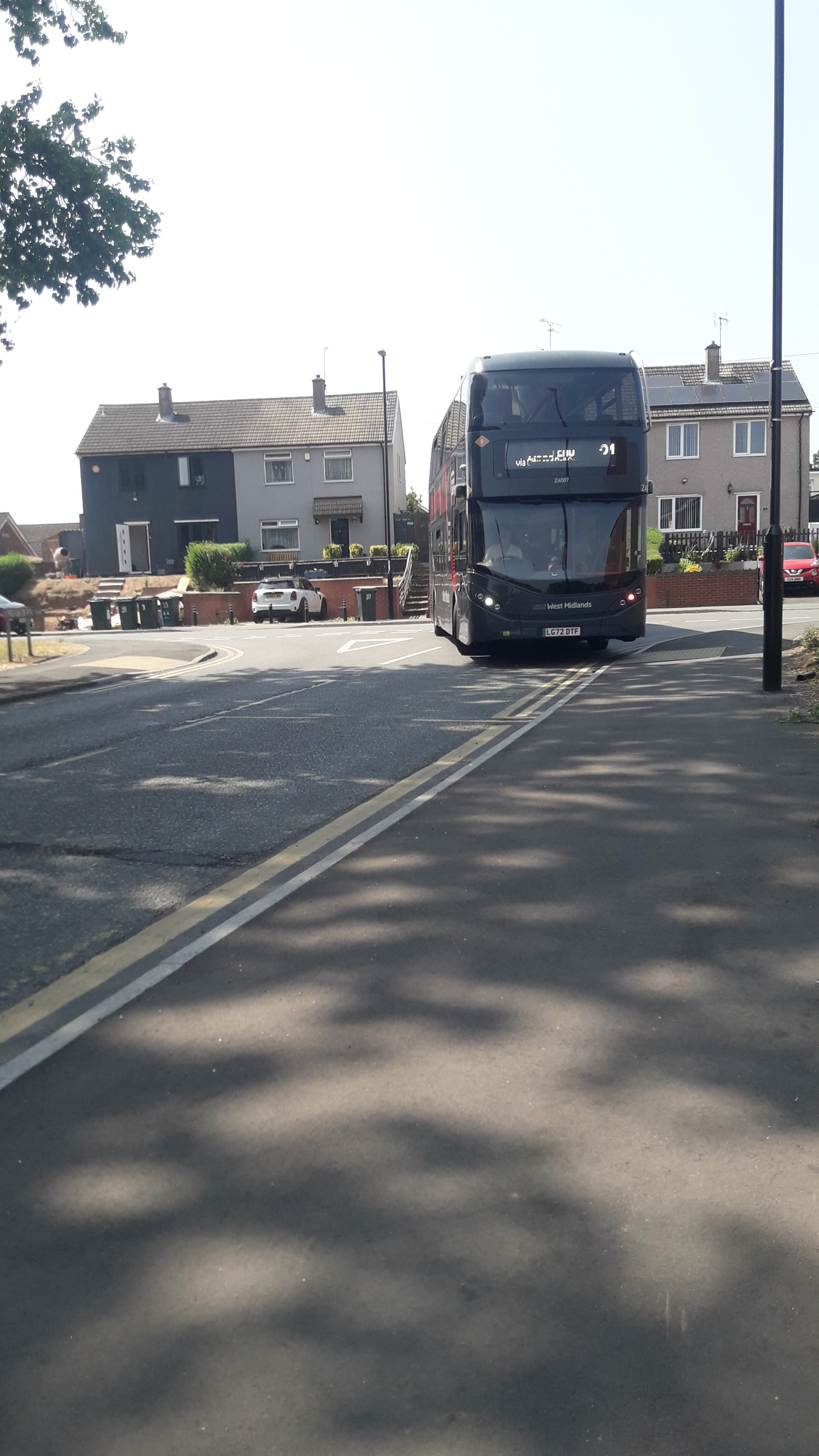
- A Enviro400EV at Hillmorton Road, Coventry

Overview
- Operator: West Midlands Bus
- Vehicle: Former: Mercedes O405s, Enviro400s, and ALX400; Present: Enviro400EVs
- Status: Operational
- Began service: November 1940
- Former operator: PrimeLines

Route
- Start: Wood End
- Via: Coventry City Centre
- End: Willenhall
- Length: Around 8 miles
- Other routes: 21S (school service from Cardinal Wiseman School to Willenhall); 21A (Middlemarch Business Park - Coventry)

West Midlands bus route 21 is a bus route in Coventry, England that is operated by West Midlands Bus. The route operates between Wood End and Willenhall. In 2025, the bus route had recorded the highest number of reported offences among Coventry bus routes between January and September 2024.

== History ==
=== Introduction ===
In November 1940, route 21 was introduced to replace tram route 5 to Bell Green following its abandonment due to air raid damage. The route initially operated between Greyfriars Green and Old Church Road via Hertford Street, Broadgate, Trinity Street, Hales Street and Stoney Stanton Road. It was extended to Coventry railway station in January 1941, before being moved to Broadway in August 1951. Further extensions followed, reaching Hall Green Road and Wood End in June 1957, and later Shilton Cross Road by 1962. In June 1962, the route was altered to operate via The Burges and Jesson Street due to new one-way systems.

In 1985, the bus route became a Cross City route that replaced the former bus route 22, going to Willenhall, this ignoring the modern bus route 22, launched in January 2022 from city centre to Little Heath.

=== Modern era ===
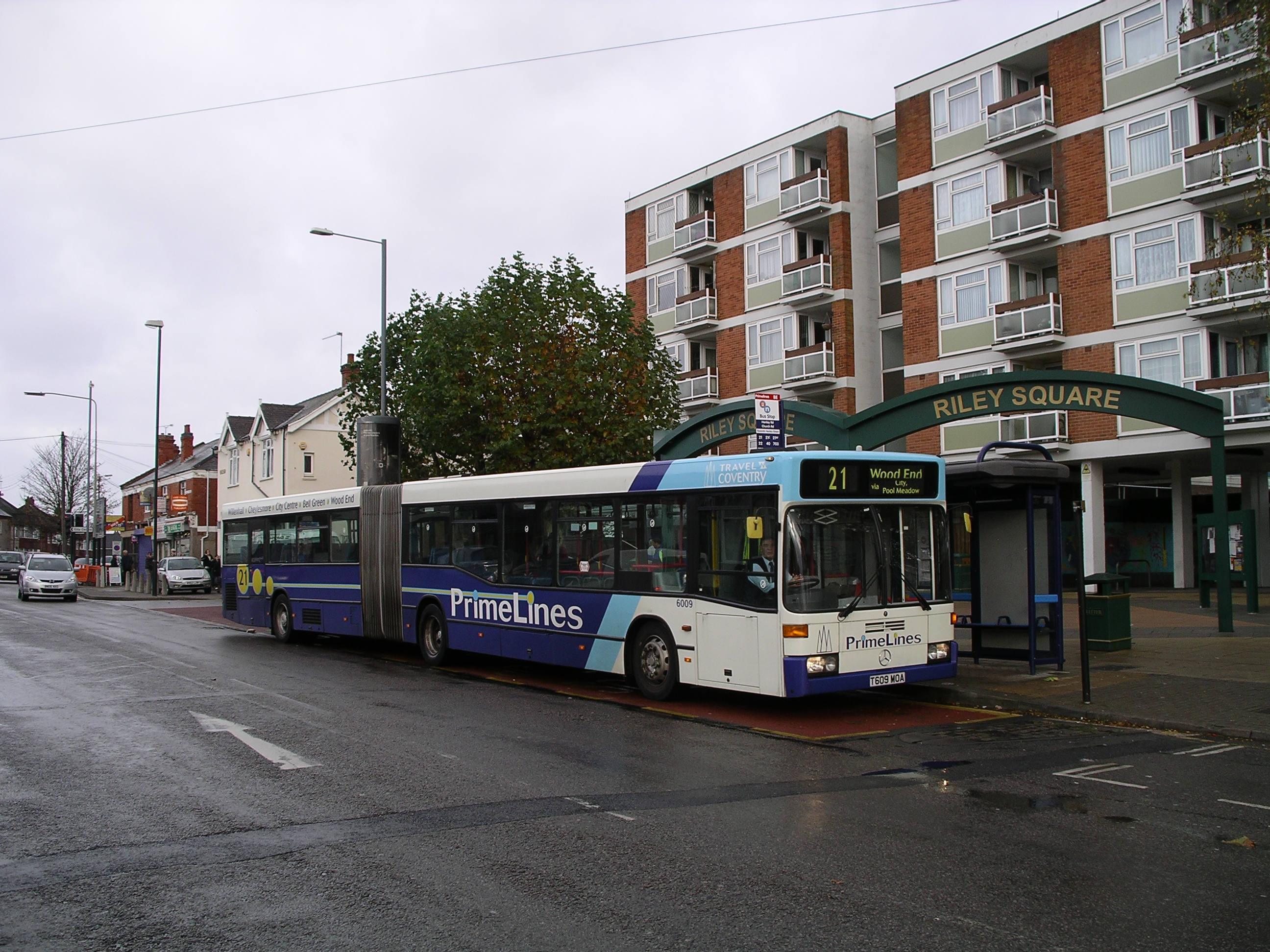
A Bus 21 Mercedes O405 Bendy Bus at Riley Square.

The bus route formerly used Mercedes O405 articulated buses, they have been withdrawn in November 2011. ALX400s were formerly used on the route, however they have been retired in December 2022. Enviro400s were also used on the route, though the whole fleet has now been replaced with the newer Enviro400EVs.

== Route ==
The bus route connects core areas including:

- Wood End
- Bell Green
- Gallagher Retail Park
- Coventry City Centre
- Whitley
- Willenhall

== Impact ==
According to Coventry Live reports, route 21 was the location for offences including nine thefts and three counts of criminal damage reported between January and September 2024 and has the most crime of any bus route in Coventry.A UK Parliament publication mentions that Route 21 serves socially excluded areas.
