= Whitefriars Housing Group =

Housing association in Coventry, England

Whitefriars Housing Group Ltd is a housing association managing about 18,000 homes in Coventry, England. Constituted as a charitable industrial and provident society, it is Coventry's largest social landlord.

In December 2008 it became part of the West Mercia Housing Group, based in Bromsgrove, which includes Harden Housing Association, Kemble Housing and Nexus Housing, and manages homes across the West Midlands, Herefordshire and Worcestershire.

Whitefriars Homes North, South and Services Limited (later becoming Whitefriars Housing Group in May 2006) were created in the lead up to September 2000 by Coventry City Council at a non-refundable cost of £2.3m to the taxpayer ahead of the outcome of a legally required tenant ballot under Schedule 3A of the Housing Act 1985 (before it was amended).

Coventry City Council controversially ignored 68.2% of people who did not vote in favour (5,220 votes against, 8,723 abstentions and 32 spoilt ballot papers) and pressed ahead with the transfer of 20,200 properties in an attempt to resolve legal issues surrounding widespread disrepair in Coventry City Council Housing and to absolve debt liabilities of between £156m - £158m onto the national taxpayer.

Only those that voted were counted despite tenant reservations given the content of the video where Coventry City Council stated that if tenants did not vote in favour, “improvements” [repairs] would not be carried out.

The transfer could strongly be argued as illegal and these facts, although shocking, are categorically backed up in a Coventry City Council Report disclosed in a Freedom of Information disclosure available on www.whatdotheyknow.com.

The scheme was overseen by Coventry City Council Counsellor Peter Lacy who became the Chief Executive of the newly formed Whitefriars group of companies and involved legal input from Trowers and Hamlins Solicitors and Lawrence Graham Solicitors.

Promises made in the Coventry City Council video sent out shortly before the tenant ballot were either broken or could not be delivered in the first place such as equivalent security of tenure (the law didn’t allow for it) and equal succession rights.

The 35 year rent guarantee for transferring tenants contained within the video (available on YouTube as “Coventry City Council, your home, your future, not your choice”) was quickly abandoned and UPVC double glazed windows and doors (to replace rotting wooden ones) and new kitchens and bathrooms were charged back to tenants without the tenants receiving recompense whilst being described by Coventry City Council as “improvements” as opposed to repairs.

Of those properties transferred, 481 of the properties were hostel units.

The name 'Whitefriars' (and also Greyfriars) comes from a Coventry monastery of the same name founded in around 1342, and gradually expanded as charitable donations and funding became available. The 'friars' survived by providing shelter to the needy and passing travellers.

The group has demolished over 4,000 former council properties that were mostly vacant and beyond economical repair. This demolition included several blocks of Wimpey no-fines constructed flats built in the 1950s in the Wood End area, including rows of garages damaged or vandalised beyond repair. Some 8-storey flats constructed in the 1950s in the Hillfields area and traditional but poorly maintained brick built houses in the Stoke Heath area of Valley Road, Meadway and Hillside have also been demolished.

In 2003, the first newly built properties by the group were completed and opened in Tile Hill. This was continued with the granting of planning permission for a further 31 units of bungalow housing for elderly people in the city. The group is now working with their partners Wates to provide 269 properties for rent and open market sale in Valley Road, Meadway and Hillside area.

Whitefriars is also involved in the New Deal for Communities area (Wood End, Henley Green, Manor Farm and Deedmore Estates) where masterplan has been developed in conjunction with the residents. The development programme commenced in 2008 and will last 12–15 years with the construction of 2,500 houses for sale, 1,000 new homes for rent by Whitefriars and 150 homes for residents who will initially move out due to the regeneration. Whitefriars is working with Bovis Homes who were appointed as preferred developer in September 2005.

As well as providing residential properties to the residents of Coventry, the Whitefriars Housing Group also has a training and development department which works with local unemployed people to teach them basic construction trade skills. Experienced self-employed people who are already working in the construction industry but want to become better qualified in their job can gain an NVQ in brickwork, plastering or carpentry through a scheme run by Whitefriars Training and Development. Whitefriars also operates a construction maintenance department named HomeWorks which is based in the Willenhall area of the city, which directly employs tradespeople including carpenters, plumbers, painters and electricians who repair properties managed by Whitefriars.

Whitefriars has put in place a 'Stardust' strategy, which aims to reward its employees with the use of a system based on voting for a winner in a stated category such as 'employee of the year', 'colleague of the year' or for 'changing peoples lives'. A Stardust conference is held during which the winners are called up onto a stage and recognised for their valued contribution and efforts. This scheme encourages staff performance.
