= Henley Green =

Suburb of Coventry, West Midlands, England

Coordinates: 52.43026°N 1.46313°W

Henley Green is a former council estate in Coventry at grid reference SP366815 adjacent to Wood End, bordered by Deedmore Road, and about a mile from the area of Bell Green. Henley Green now consists of a mixture of private and social housing. The neighbourhood is part of the Henley ward.

== History ==
This housing estate was mostly built by Wimpey around 1955, the majority of properties were built out of no fines by a method of cast pouring. The 'pour' contains 'no fine' particles (sand) and as such is a mixture of crushed pebbles and cementitious liquid slurry. The no fines building process allows for the quick construction of structures. Henley Green, Wood End and other 'council estates' were built to house an influx of workers who were mostly arriving in Coventry during a boom in the Car and other local industry.

Some three storey (four bedroomed) houses were built in Deedmore Road of a more traditional brick design, these are similar structures to the houses in Foxglove Close and Leeder Close off Everdon Road, Holbrooks built around the same time and are early town houses with a utility room and storage on the ground floor, living area on the first floor and bedrooms above. More three bedroomed houses built of traditional brick, stand in Deedmore Road, Eccles Close and Petitor Crescent Henley Green.

Street names in Henley Green include Roselands Avenue, Chudleigh Road, Monkswood Crescent, Luscombe Road, Lynmouth Road, Logan Road, Widdecombe Close and Ashburton Road.

Several houses were built in Clennon Rise and Roselands Avenue in the early 1990s, these are modern red-brick properties belonging to a social landlord. Several blocks of flats have now been demolished. Some of these stood in Clennon Rise some in Monkswood Crescent and this included the removal of several no fines built 1950s 'Star Blocks' (four storey blocks of 12 flats). One such Star Block still remains in Watcombe Road Henley Green. These flats formerly Coventry Council properties were passed onto the ownership of Whitefriars Housing Group in 2001 and then demolished due to their poor condition which was making them hard to let. The area now has several empty spaces awaiting re-development.

Part of Luscombe Road faces onto open ground, this ground has now been granted formal village green status after proposals to build houses on this land failed, all due to local pressure. Local residents hold fund raising events on the village green. This land also leads onto what is locally known as the Black Pad. The Black Pad is close to where a railway line once passed through the area. This railway line would have crossed Henley Road and this 'line' can still be walked. The Black Pad leads towards Woodway Lane and the Woodway Park residential area of Coventry.

== Facilities ==
Henley Green has a small row of shops which have three bedroomed 'houses' above, shops there include a post office, butcher's shop, and a supermarket. There is also a burnt-out public house and a fairly recent children's play area installed to improve the area.

Henley College Coventry is located on Henley Road, at the edge of Henley Green and adjacent area Bell Green.

== Redevelopment ==
Coventry NDC, is the £54 million regeneration programme working in the areas of Wood End, Henley Green, Manor Farm and Deedmore, funded this large-scale capital build project following consultation with local residents about what they wanted to see in their local area. £10 million of funding came from the NDC Programme with a further £1 million from the Football Foundation, Sport England and FIFA. The project has been managed and supported by Coventry City Council.

=== Moat House ===
On 2 March 2009, the Moat House Leisure and Neighbourhood Centre was opened on Winston Avenue, in Henley Green. The centre is run by Coventry Sports Trust and has facilities including a sports hall, youth gym and full size artificial pitch. In 2010, the centre won a Godiva Award for "Best Health & Fitness Venue".
