= CV6 =

CV6 may refer to:

- CV6, a postal district in the CV postcode area, UK
- USS Enterprise (CV-6), a former US aircraft carrier
