= Binley Mega Chippy =

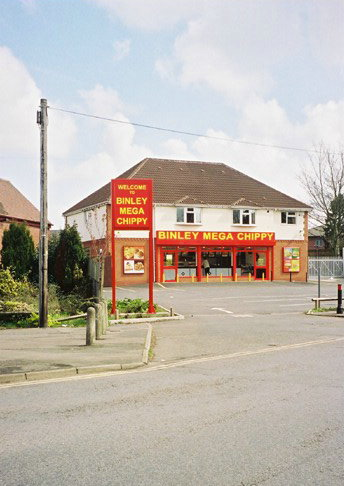
- Interactive map of Binley Mega Chippy

Restaurant information
- Established: 2004
- Owner: Kamal Gandhi
- Location: Coventry, West Midlands, England
- Coordinates: 52.4023150°N 1.4458133°W

Binley Mega Chippy is a chip shop located in Binley, Coventry, England.

== Description ==
Binley Mega Chippy primarily sells fish and chips, however their menu also includes doner kebabs and fried chicken. A purported £4.99 "Morbius" meal deal gained traction online in 2022, however no such promotion existed.

== History ==
Binley Mega Chippy was founded in 2004 and was later bought in 2008 by Deano Tandon. It was then sold to Kamal Ghandi in late 2021. The store went viral in May of 2022, when a TikTok user created a song using text-to-speech which repeated the lyrics "Binley Mega Chippy" to a tune similar to that of the song For He's a Jolly Good Fellow.

== Reception ==
Writing for National World, Isabella Boneham described the fish and chips as surprisingly good, saying that "fish was nice and white, not dry, and the chips were fresh." Nathan Bickerton of Vice praised the fish for being "greasy, very filling and about the size of [a] forearm and fist."
