= Jordan Mackampa =

British-Congolese soul musician

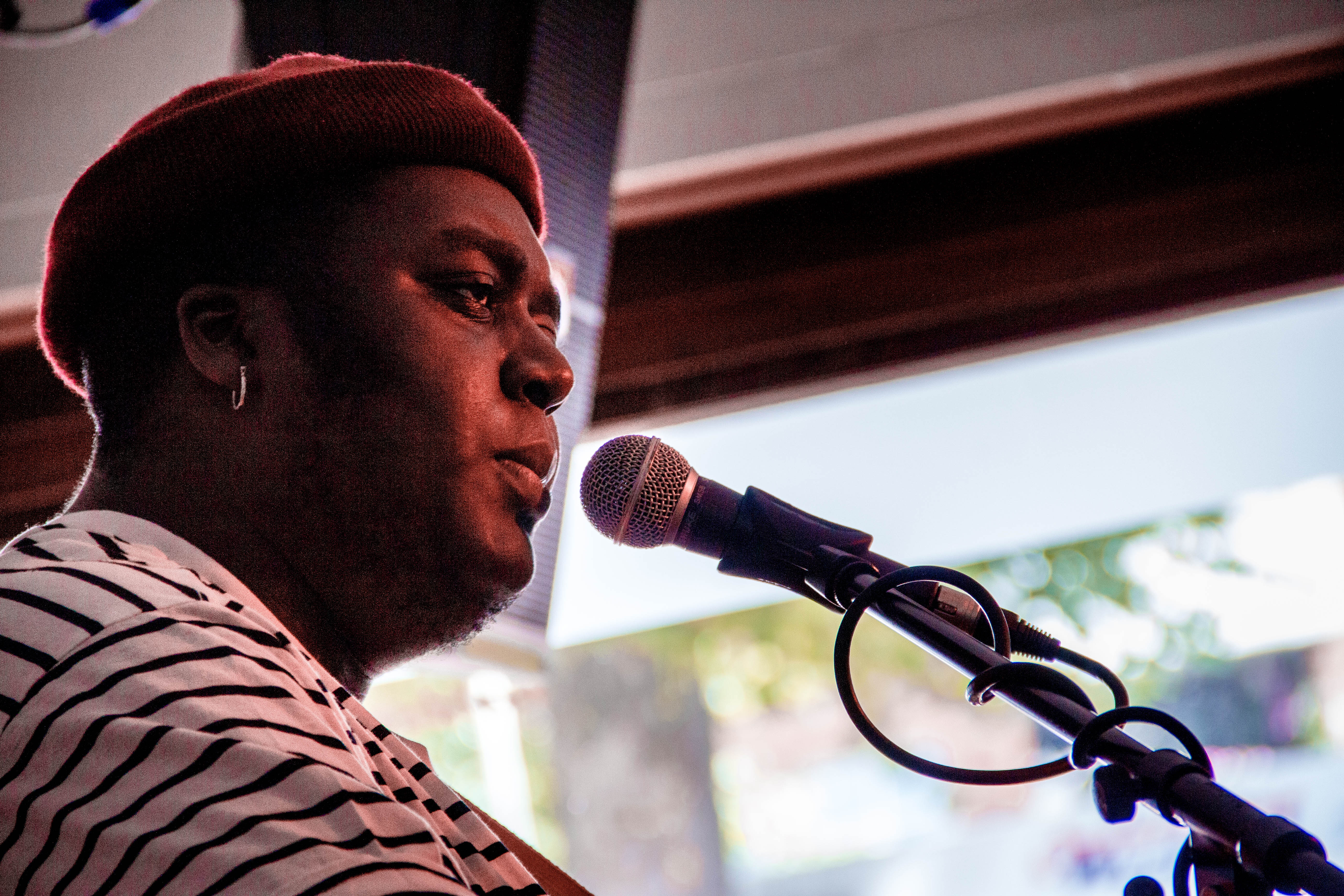
- Jordan Mackampa performing at the Haldern Pop Festival in 2018

Background information
- Born: 26 April 1994 (age 32); Zaire
- Origin: London, England
- Genre: soul
- Occupations: Singer, songwriter
- Years active: 2016–present
- Label: AWAL
- Website: https://www.jordanmackampa.com/

Jordan Mackampa (born 26 April 1994) is a British-Congolese musician. His first album Foreigner was released in March 2020.

== Biography ==
Mackampa was born in Zaire in 1994, and French is his first language. He and his mother moved to London in 1995. Mackampa began playing guitar and composing songs at the age of 12.

He attended the Cardinal Wiseman Catholic School in Coventry. As a teenager, he would record music in a studio in the neighbourhood youth center. He went on to study music at the University of Northampton. Mackampa has named soul singers such as Marvin Gaye and Bill Withers as shaping his musical style.

== Career ==
In 2016, Mackampa self-released his EP, Physics. He released another EP, Tales from the Broken, in 2017. He toured with Rhiannon Giddens, Lewis Watson, Blanco White, Giant Rooks, X Ambassadors, Jeremy Loops and Amber Run .

His song "Battlecry" was used as the opening theme for the British TV drama Our Girl in its third and fourth seasons, from 2017 to 2020. The song was also used in the 2019 worldwide "Use Your Voice" advertising campaign for Levi's and for the 2020 television advert for Intel.

Mackampa signed a record deal with AWAL Recordings in 2017 and released his first studio album, Foreigner, in March 2020. The album addresses Mackampa's experiences growing up as a Congolese immigrant in England.

While Mackampa was planned to headline an international tour and perform at South by Southwest in 2020, both events were cancelled due to the COVID-19 pandemic. He released his third EP, Come Around, in January 2021. In December 2021, Mackampa released a limited edition run of vinyl featuring the Come Around EP, recorded live at Abbey Road Studios and titled Live from Studio 2.

His song "Magic" was used in the 2021 UK television advert for Boots Pharmacy and the online Christmas J Crew adverts featuring Jodie Turner-Smith and her husband Joshua Jackson. He was featured in a 2021 Fender campaign alongside Conan Gray, Lucy Dacus, Self Esteem, Faye Webster, SG Lewis, Jesse Rutherford and Danny Felix.

== Discography ==
=== Studio albums ===
Title	Details
Foreigner	Released: 13 March 2020; Label: AWAL; Formats: CD, streaming, digital download
WELCOME HOME, KID!	Released: 16 February 2024; Label: AWAL; Formats: CD, streaming, digital download

=== EPs ===
Title	Details
Physics	Released: 30 September 2016; Label: self-released; Formats: Streaming, digital download
Tales from the Broken	Released: 15 May 2017; Label: self-released; Formats: Streaming, digital download
Come Around	Released: 22 January 2021; Label: AWAL; Formats: Streaming, digital download
Live From Studio 2	Released: 17 December 2021; Label: AWAL; Formats: Vinyl
