= Walsgrave on Sowe =

Suburban village of Coventry, West Midlands, England

Coordinates: 52.4282°N 1.4405°W

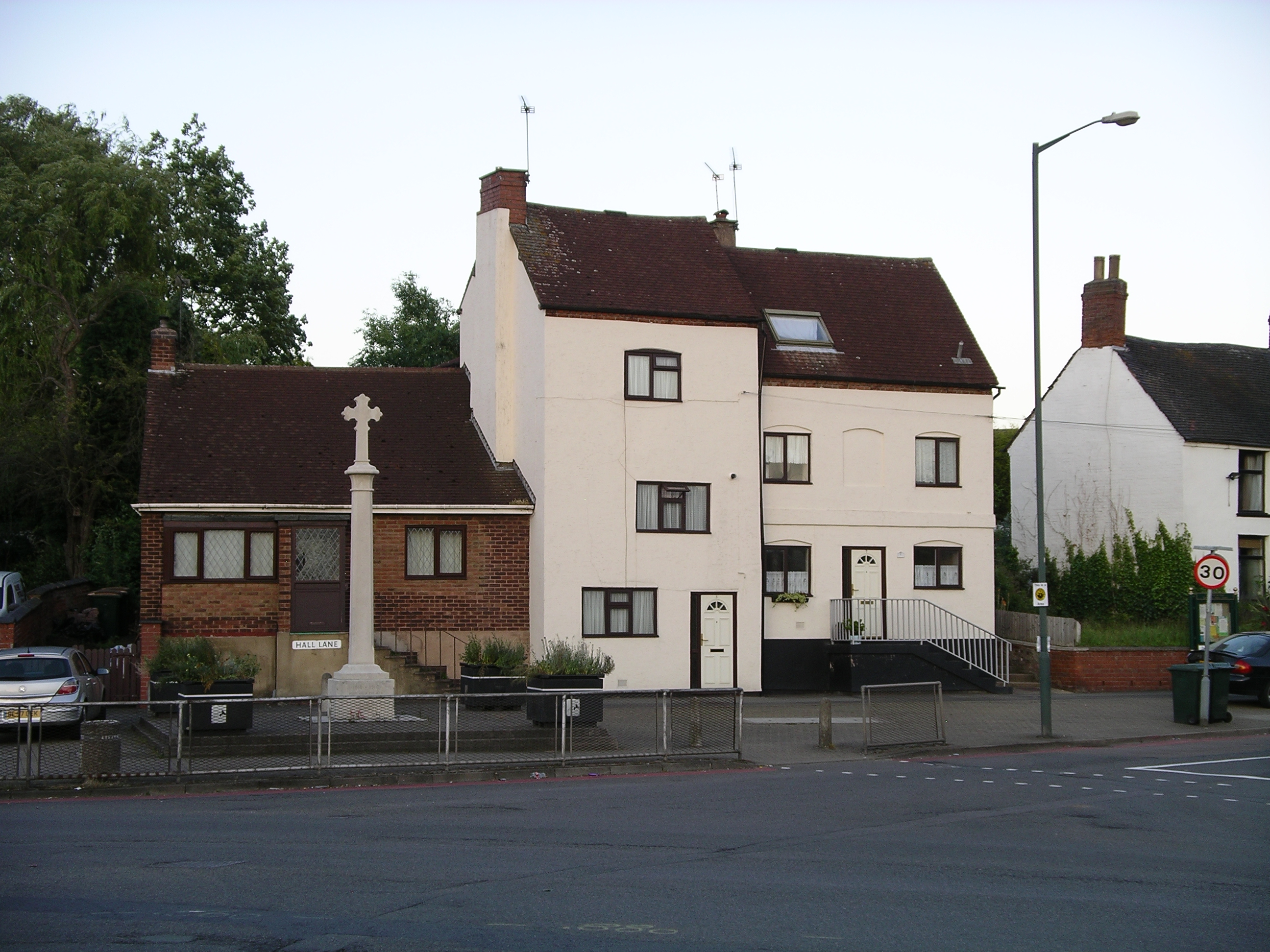
- War memorial and houses on Hall Lane.

- Location within the West Midlands
- Metropolitan borough: Coventry
- Metropolitan county: West Midlands
- Region: West Midlands
- Country: England
- Sovereign state: United Kingdom
- Post town: COVENTRY
- Postcode district: CV2
- Dialling code: 024

Walsgrave on Sowe, or simply Walsgrave, is a suburban district situated approximately 3.5 miles (5.6 km) north-east of central Coventry, in the county of the West Midlands, central England. Although it now experiences very little flooding, it was built on marshlands. However, due to urban growth, it is now an outer suburb of Coventry, south-west of the villages of Ansty and Shilton. Walsgrave on Sowe neighbours the Potters Green, Clifford Park, Woodway Park, Wyken, Henley Green and Mount Pleasant areas of Coventry, and is in the Henley ward of the city, although Walsgrave-on-Sowe was formerly in the Wyken Ward prior to ward changes made in 2003 by the Local Government Boundary Commission for England (LGBCE).

== History ==
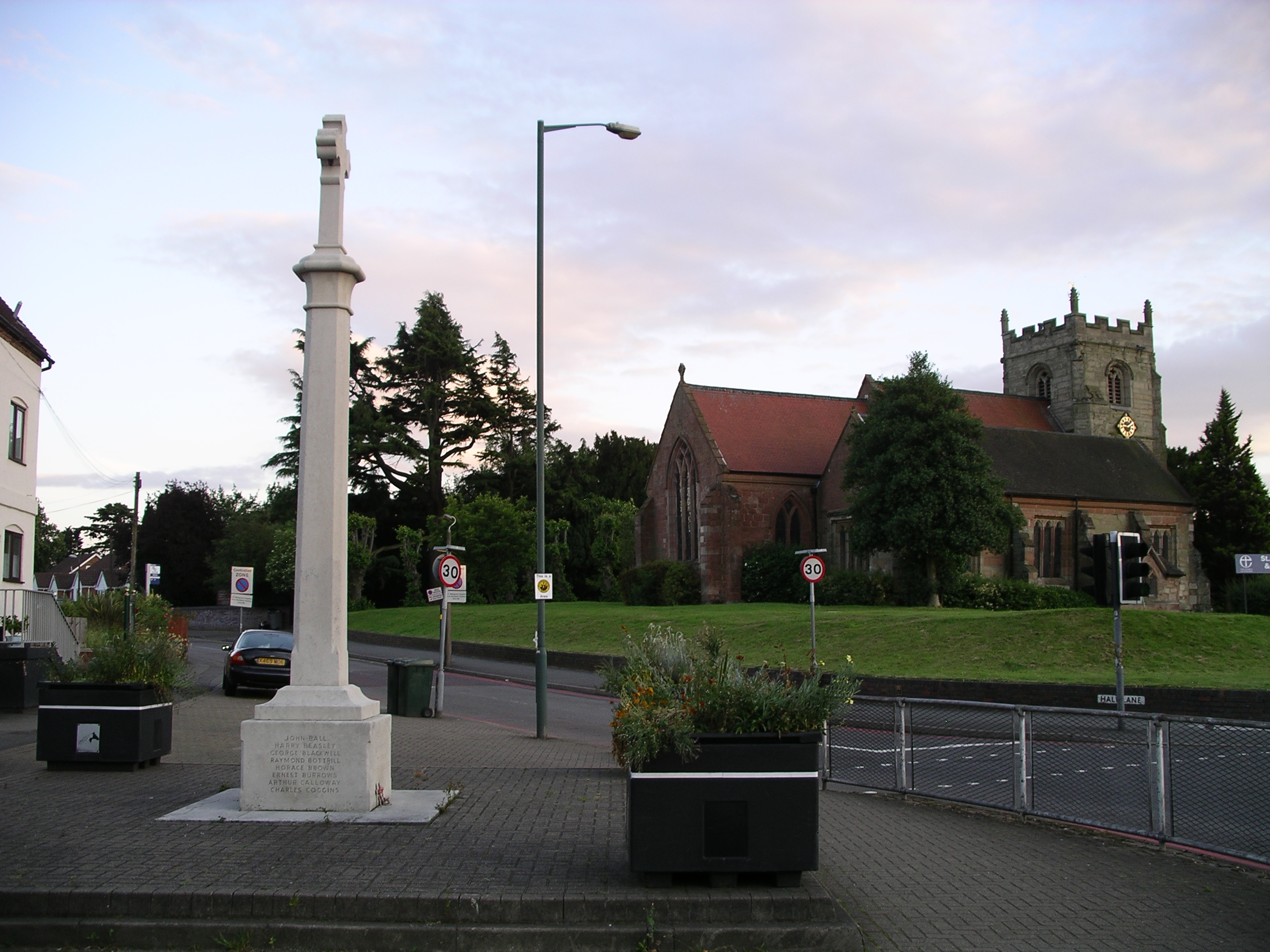
The 1914–1918 war memorial with St Mary's Church in the background

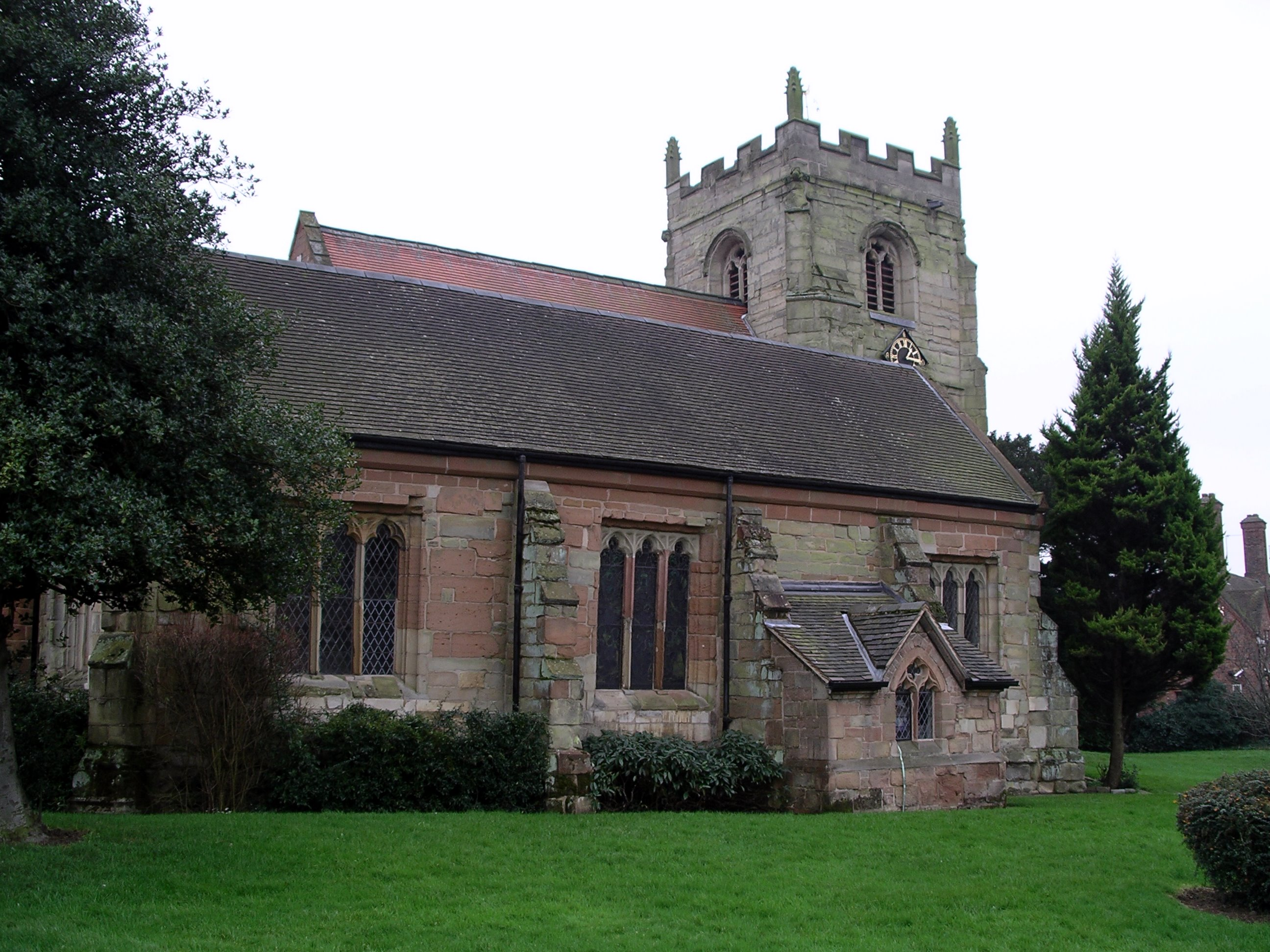
St Mary's Church (side view), Walsgrave

Walsgrave has reputedly been in existence for approximately 1,000 years. The first mention of a chapel in Walsgrave-on-Sowe (then known as Sowe) was in 1221. It is likely that the chapel would have been built after 1086, as there is no reference in the Domesday Book of a priest serving the area. St Mary's Church currently stands on the site of the former chapel. The original graveyard for the church was covered over and now forms the slope in front of the church, facing onto the main road.

Walsgrave grew into a sizeable village commercially based around agriculture and coal mining. Plans for incorporating Walsgrave within the boundaries of Coventry were proposed in the late 1920s, and Walsgrave gradually lost its individual identity owing to new road development, the replacement of much of its older buildings and houses with new housing schemes, and the eventual closure of the pit (Craven Colliery, sited off Henley Road). However, an old weaver's cottage lay directly opposite St Mary's Church; subjected to fire and weathering, it was restored a number of times but still stands as a reminder of the village's origins. (This cottage became derelict and has now been demolished and now incorporates a row of new cottages). Additional older buildings that still stand can be found on the Hinckley road just east of the war memorial, along Hall Lane and School House Lane and along Woodway Lane close to the former Craven Arms public house.

In 1931 the civil parish had a population of 2250. On 1 April 1932 the parish was abolished and merged with Coventry, Combe Fields, Ansty, Shilton and Bedworth.

== Economy ==
Walsgrave lies south of the M6 and M69 interchange and has a growing commercial area including a Barclays bank call centre, Lloyds Pharmacy Head Office and several other companies important to Coventry. Opposite Paradise Way is the Walsgrave Triangle Retail Park and Cross Point Business Park. Here there is a Premier Inn, Brewers Fayre restaurant named Cross Point, Holiday Inn, a large Tesco store, a Nando's, Showcase Cinema and several more business offices and warehouses.

== Infrastructure ==
=== Health ===
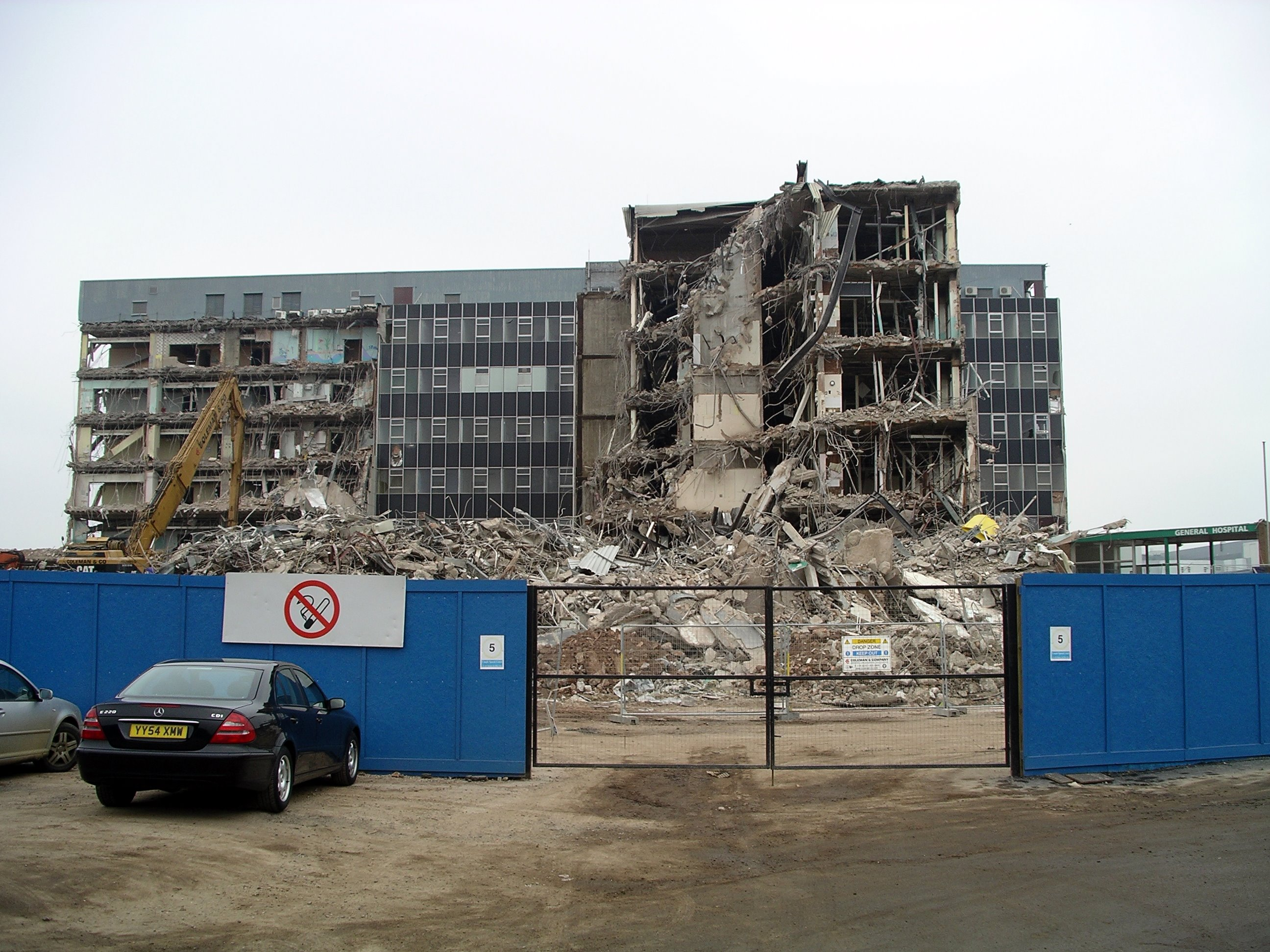
The former Walsgrave Hospital during demolition on 1 February 2007

Coventry's PFI hospital, University Hospital Coventry, replaced the buildings of the former Walsgrave Hospital. This hospital has a helipad, and receives a large number of patients from all over the Midlands.

=== Education ===
Primary Schools within the area are Sir Frank Whittle, Walsgrave CoE Primary School and SS Peter and Paul RC Primary. Nearby schools include Potters Green Primary, there are two secondary schools which are Cardinal Wiseman Catholic School and Grace Academy, formerly known as Woodway Park School and Community College.

== Transport ==
The area is served by West Midlands Bus bus routes 1, 3, 8, 85, 20A & 20C, Stagecoach 703, 60 & 585 and Arriva Midlands routes 74, 78 & X6. The Stagecoach and Arriva services along with West Midlands Bus service 85 were operated by Travel de Courcey until the company entered administration in August 2020.

Walsgrave is the location for junction 2 of the M6 Motorway where it meets the M69 Motorway. The area is by-passed by the A46.

== Sport ==
A short lived greyhound racing track was opened as 16 November 1929 on the Cowley Road. The racing was independent (not affiliated to the sports governing body the National Greyhound Racing Club) and was known as a flapping track, which was the nickname given to independent tracks. The racing finished on 22 July 1937.
