= Riverbank Academy =

Coordinates: 52°23′08″N 01°29′00″W

Location
- Princethorpe Way; Binley; Coventry, West Midlands, CV3 2QD; England

Information
- Type: Special school; Academy
- Local authority: Coventry
- Department for Education URN: 141376 Tables
- Ofsted: Reports
- Gender: Mixed
- Age: 11 to 19
- Enrolment: 145 as of March 2016

Riverbank Academy (formerly Alice Stevens School) is a broad spectrum special secondary school situated in Binley, Coventry, England.

The school's history dates back to 1909 and it was relocated to its current site on Ashington Grove, Whitley in 1953. The school was previously named after a former Coventry City councillor who worked for the city's children. In January 2015, Alice Stevens School converted to academy status and was renamed Riverbank Academy.

The school is now located on Princethorpe way in Coventry.
