= Emma McGann =

British singer-songwriter, musician

- Birth name: Emma Rebecca McGann
- Born: 29 May 1990 (age 34); Coventry, England
- Genres: Pop
- Occupations: Singer; Songwriter; Live-Streamer
- Instruments: Vocals; Guitar; Piano
- Years active: 2008–present
- Website: www.emmamcgann.com

Emma Rebecca McGann (born 29 May 1990) is a British singer-songwriter, musician, and online live-streamer on broadcasting platforms YouNow and Twitch.

== Early life ==
McGann was born in 1990 in the Midlands, England.

== Education ==
She attended Cardinal Wiseman Catholic School and pursued further education in music at Coventry University graduating in 2012 with a degree in Music Composition and Professional Practice.

== Music career ==
Her first album was Start the Show (2010).

In 2014, McGann released "Cherry On Top" which received airplay on BBC Radio 1 in January 2015.

McGann is an online live-streamer on broadcasting platform YouNow (previously BlogTV) and makes a living from performing live-streamed gigs from a home studio.

She premiered a track in 2015 called "Me and YouNow" through the site followed by a music video.

On 24 November 2017, McGann released the double disc album B.R.A.V.E.. It includes songs like "Second Chances", "Forest Fire" and more.

== Awards and nominations ==
She was nominated in the iHeartRadio Music Awards 2017 Social Star Award Category.

McGann was nominated and shortlisted as a finalist in the Shorty Awards 2016 in the YouNower of the Year Category.

She was shortlisted as a runner-up for funding in the PRS for Music Foundation's Lynsey de Paul Prize 2015.

McGann accepted a music award in 2010 (a StudyVox FM Music Award) presented by Kylie Minogue for her single "Fall Into Me".
