= Wood End, Coventry =

Area of Coventry, England

Coordinates: 52.439°N 1.466°W

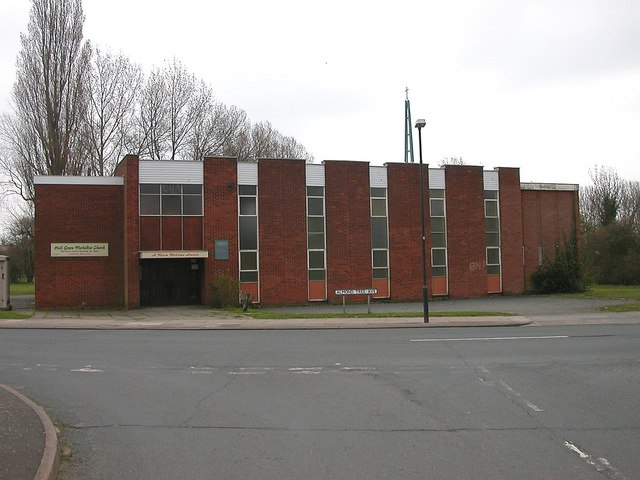
Hall Green Methodist Church

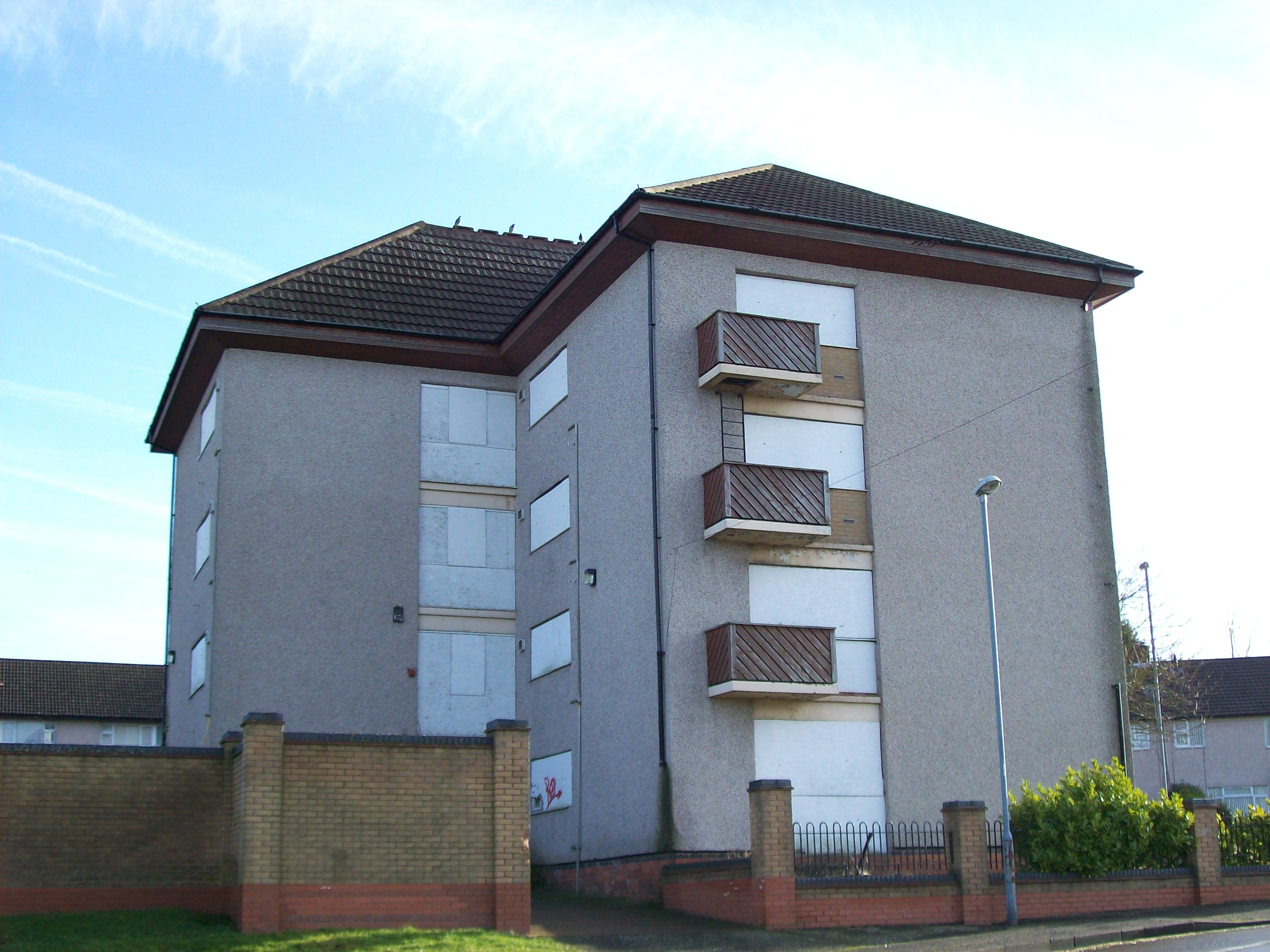
Redevelopment in 2009

Wood End is an area in the north of the city of Coventry, England. Wood End is surrounded by the districts of Bell Green, Alderman's Green, Potters Green and Henley Green.

== Location ==
To the south of Wood End is the Manor Farm estate, which along with Henley Green and Deedmore, make up the four areas marked for redevelopment in the New Deal for Communities programme. Along with Walsgrave and Potters Green, these six areas make up the Henley ward.

== History ==
Wood End was built by the city council in the late 1950s and early 1960s, to rehouse families from inner-city slum clearances as well as people moving into the city to work in the city's then-booming car industry.

=== Crime ===
During the 1980s, the Wood End area quickly became known as one of the most deprived areas in the city of Coventry, due to some of the highest levels of crime and unemployment in the city. Soon, £34 million was invested on improving the estate between 1987 and 2002, with many homes being refurbished and some being demolished, as well as new community projects being launched, but crime rates remained high and Wood End was unable to shake-off its unwanted reputation.

== Housing ==
Many of the homes are now owned by the Whitefriars Housing Group, a housing trust which took over the running and management of Coventry's council houses in 2000. In 2024 time 19,000 homes are to be owned by Citizen Housing Group for Coventry's council houses. In April 2004, it was announced that Wood End, along with three other neighbouring districts, was to be extensively redeveloped. The outline plans stated that a large percentage of the estate's homes would be demolished and replaced with new homes to which existing tenants would be entitled to live.

== Critical reception ==
=== Accessibility ===
It was reported on the 6 July 2006 Coventry Evening Telegraph that the Severn Trent water company had revealed that the Wood End area is inaccessible without a police escort, even for emergencies, due to earlier attacks on employees. It was also revealed that Wood End is the only estate in the region which has a danger warning especially on Yewdale Crescent which is usually home to a serious issue of Wood End drug dealing and unfriendly behaviour; there has been civil unrest on several occasions.

=== Riots/violence ===
On 12 May 1992, rioting which lasted days began in Wood End. Young people threw petrol bombs at riot police after a crackdown on local youths using scrambler bikes. Passing vehicles were stoned, and nearby Wyken Infants School was badly damaged in an arson attack. The following night, 16 people were arrested after police were targeted with bricks and petrol bombs in a disturbance outside 'The Live & Let Live' public house. The rioting then spread to the Willenhall district in the south-east of the city. The third night of disturbances in Wood End saw people pull metal shutters from the frontage of a newsagents. On the fourth night, firefighters were stoned and police in Willenhall district had objects thrown from upstairs windows and balconies of flats. The rioting ceased on 17 May. Newly-elected local Labour MP Bob Ainsworth condemned the violence, but was keen to highlight that it was almost inevitable due to the lack of opportunities available in the area, particularly unemployment which stood at around 25% locally, as well as family breakdown, poverty and child neglect. People reported seeing middle-aged men cheering on the mostly teenager as they struggled with police. Community members blamed the local police for their harassment of local youths, and defended the estate's reputation by praising its strong sense of community.

On 18 June 2009, around 30 people set fire to rubbish and debris around Ashorne Close and then threw missiles at police and firefighters.
