= Odstone =

Hamlet in Leicestershire, England

Coordinates: 52.65°N 01.42°W

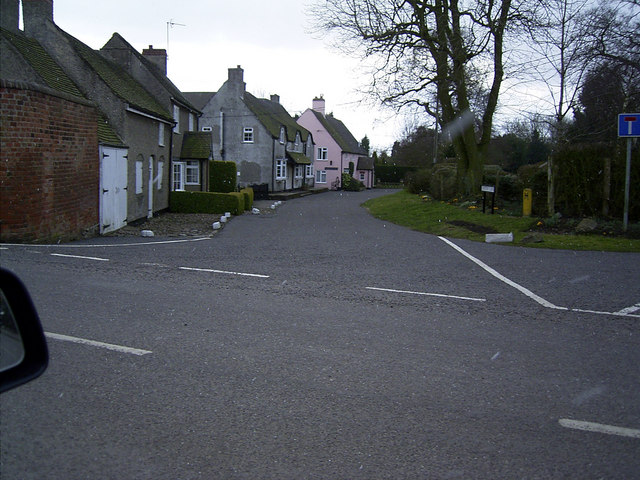
- Smithy Lane

- Location within Leicestershire
- OS grid reference: SK3907
- Civil parish: Shackerstone
- District: Hinckley and Bosworth
- Shire county: Leicestershire
- Region: East Midlands
- Country: England
- Sovereign state: United Kingdom
- Post town: Nuneaton
- Postcode district: CV13
- Police: Leicestershire
- Fire: Leicestershire
- Ambulance: East Midlands

Odstone is a hamlet and former civil parish, now in the parish of Shackerstone, in the Hinckley and Bosworth district of Leicestershire, England. It stands on a marked promontory of high ground between two river valleys. In 1931 the parish had a population of 142.

The village appears in the Domesday Book as Odeston, meaning either "Odd's farm or village", or "settlement on the protruding piece of land", oddr being the Old Norse for "point". Many local towns and villages share a similar Scandinavian heritage.

Odstone became a parish in 1866, on 1 April 1935 the parish was abolished and merged with Shackerstone.
