= Whoberley =

Suburb of Coventry, England

Coordinates: 52.409°N 1.553°W

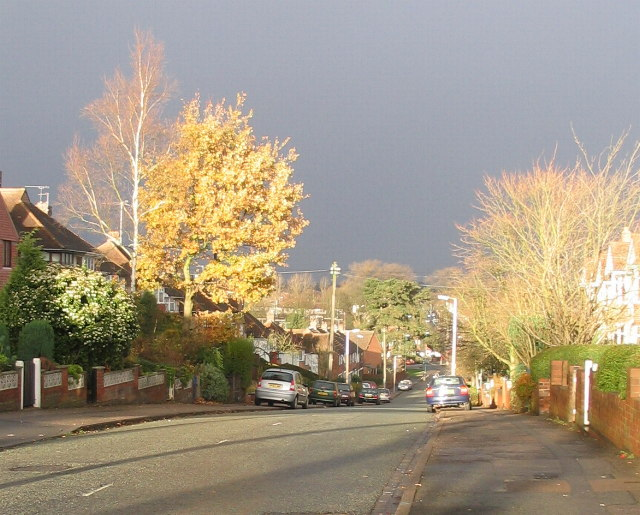
Glendower Avenue, Whoberley

Whoberley is a residential suburb of the City of Coventry in the West Midlands, England.

The population of the Coventry Ward at the 2011 census was 15,903.

Situated approximately 2 miles to the west of the city centre, it borders Allesley and Allesley Park to the north, Lime Tree Park to the southwest, Chapelfields to the east and Mount Nod/Eastern Green to the west. Hearsall Common, in the district of Earlsdon, lies to the southeast.
