= Edgwick =

Human settlement in West Midlands, England

Coordinates: 52.4255°N 1.4904°W

Edgwick is a residential area of Coventry, West Midlands, England.

It is situated approximately 2 miles north of the city centre, between the districts of Great Heath and Foleshill.

It has a major park and an enclosed children's play area.

The area is variously spelt as Edgewick or Edgwick. It is sometimes described as "Edgwick, Foleshill".

Edgwick had a population of 15,200 in 1965 and 14,100 in 1981. The Alfred Herbert machine tool manufacturing plant was in Edgwick.
