= Binley, Coventry =

Suburb of Coventry, England

Coordinates: 52.40198°N 1.44629°W

Binley
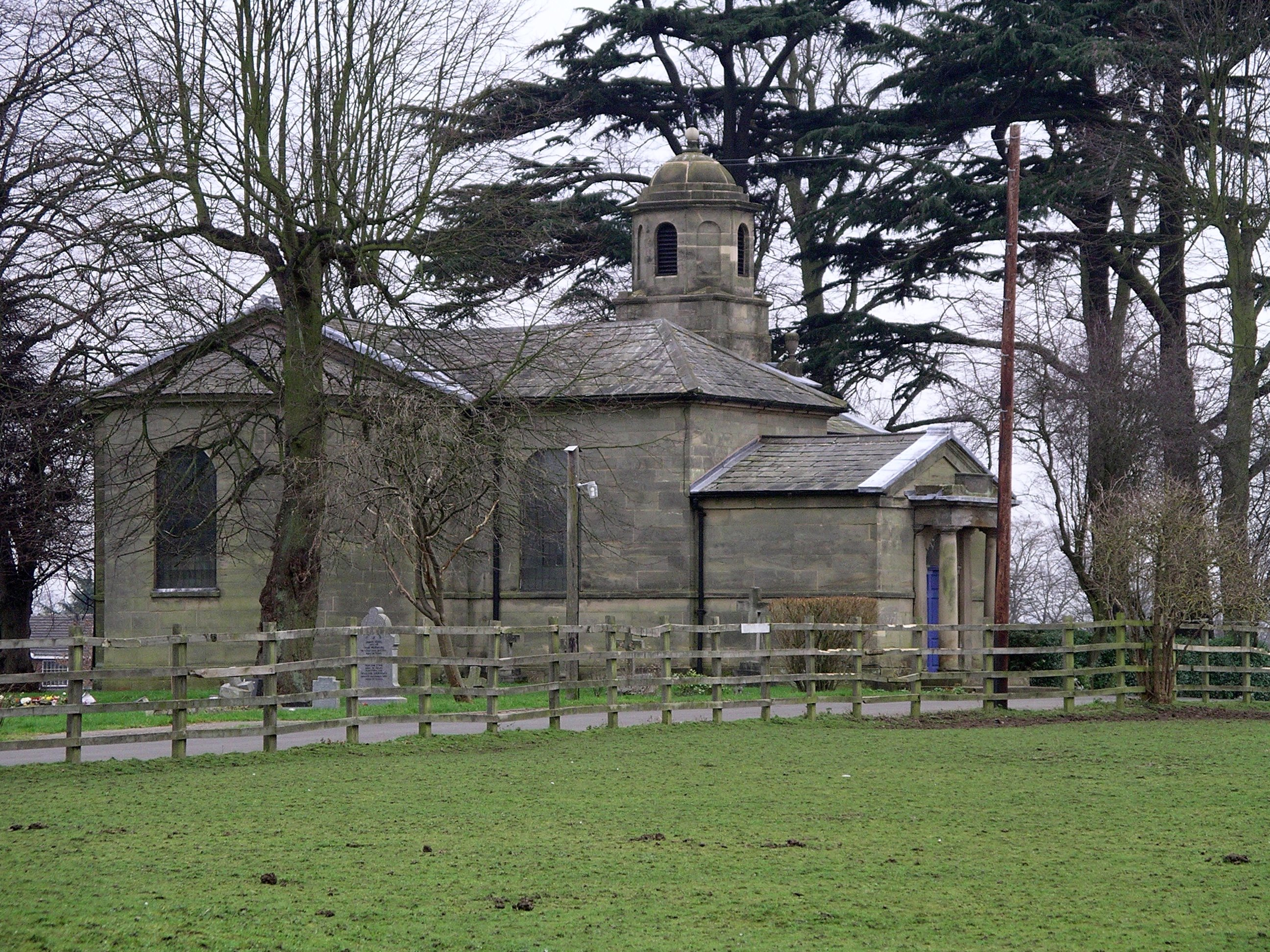
- St Bartholomew's Church, Binley, Coventry (pictured February 2007)

- Location within the West Midlands
- Metropolitan borough: Coventry
- Metropolitan county: West Midlands
- Region: West Midlands
- Country: England
- Sovereign state: United Kingdom
- Post town: COVENTRY
- Postcode district: CV3
- Dialling code: 024

Binley is a suburb on the eastern edge of the city of Coventry, West Midlands, England. Binley evolved from a small mining village on the outskirts of Coventry to a large residential area composing private residences and council-owned properties. It is famous for the Binley Mega Chippy, which is located within Binley.

Binley is part of the ward of Binley and Willenhall, which had a population of 17,774 at the 2021 census.

Binley is flanked by Willenhall to the south (separated by the Coventry to Rugby railway line), Stoke Aldermoor to the west (separated by Allard Way), and the Warwickshire village of Binley Woods to the east, which almost joins Binley since the construction of the Eastern Bypass, a B&Q store and a T.G.I. Friday's restaurant between the two areas. The final side is Copsewood, leading to Wyken in one direction, and Stoke the other.

== History ==
Binley was originally a village, and was mentioned in the Domesday Book of 1086. Most of the old civil parish of Binley was incorporated into the City of Coventry in 1932, with part transferred to Combe Fields and the rest re-named Binley Woods.

The local church of St Bartholomew was built in 1773, at the expense of William Craven, 6th Baron Craven. It is now grade I listed.

Binley Colliery was opened in 1908, and was at one time the most efficient and prosperous colliery in the Warwickshire coalfield, it was modernised in the 1950s, but was closed in 1963. The entrance was on Willenhall Lane. Herald Way industrial estate now occupies the site. Former pit worker cottages still remain along Willenhall Lane and St James Lane.

In the early 1970s, a new housing estate called Ernesford Grange was built adjacent to Binley. Many of the new closes were named after miners who were well known in the community, William McKee, George Robertson, and Sam Gault being examples. Binley grew further in the 1990s and 2000s with a large housing development being constructed to the east and north of the old schools and extending to Brinklow Road (near to Coombe Country Park). This new area was the size of the existing Binley suburb but was not given its own identity, and was amalgamated with Binley, though it is occasionally and unofficially referred to as North Binley or New Binley.

The flight path of the Coventry Airport in the nearby village of Baginton ran just to the east of Binley. On 4 December 2025, the Civil Aviation Authority confirmed the permanent closure of the airport on 11 June 2026.

The buildings of the old Binley school became "Lino's Restaurant", which was demolished in 2007 to make way for new housing. Three other Binley schools disappeared in the early 1980s to make way for a large industrial and office complex.

== Places ==
The construction of St Bartholomew's Church was funded by Lord Craven. It was consecrated in 1772, with its 200th anniversary celebrated in 1972. It has a grey slate roof, and its walls consist of light-coloured stone which appear grey after being coloured with a cement wash. The Coombe Social Club has been serving Binley locals since 1929 and has thousands of members.

== Schools ==
- Clifford Bridge Academy
- St Bartholomew's CE Academy
- Sowe Valley Primary School

== Business and industrial parks ==
The head offices of the Coventry Building Society and Cemex UK are located at Binley Business Park.

== Binley Mega Chippy ==
Binley Mega Chippy
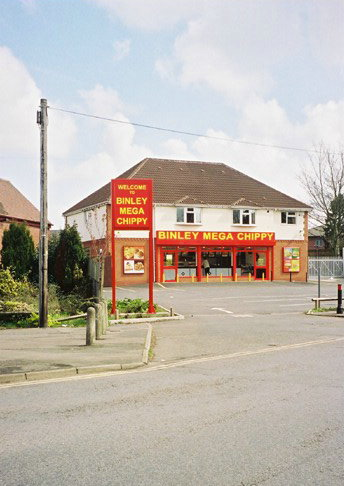
- Binley Mega Chippy in 2008
- Type: Fish and chip shop
- Founded: 2004; 22 years ago
- Area served: Binley, Coventry
- Products: Fish and chips
- Owner: Kamal Gandhi
- Number of employees: 7

Binley Mega Chippy is a fish and chip shop which opened in 2004. In early 2022, users on social networking platforms Twitter and TikTok started sharing ironic memes about the chip shop. A now renowned jingle about the chip shop was created and the venue went viral on the internet. A hashtag "#BinleyMegaChippy" was viewed online nearly 235 million times by June 2022. Staff and local shoppers admitted their initial confusion about the sudden surge in popularity. By May 2022, the venue had become so well known that it received visitors from Scotland, Portugal, and Australia.

== Proposed railway station ==
In 2023, Transport for West Midlands (TfWM) put forward plans to open a new railway station at Binley on the line between Coventry and Rugby named Coventry East (Binley).
