= Cannon Park =

Suburb of Coventry, West Midlands, England

Coordinates: 52.38736°N 1.55525°W

- Location within the West Midlands
- Metropolitan borough: Coventry
- Metropolitan county: West Midlands
- Region: West Midlands
- Country: England
- Sovereign state: United Kingdom
- Post town: COVENTRY
- Postcode district: CV4
- Dialling code: 024
- Police: West Midlands
- Fire: West Midlands
- Ambulance: West Midlands

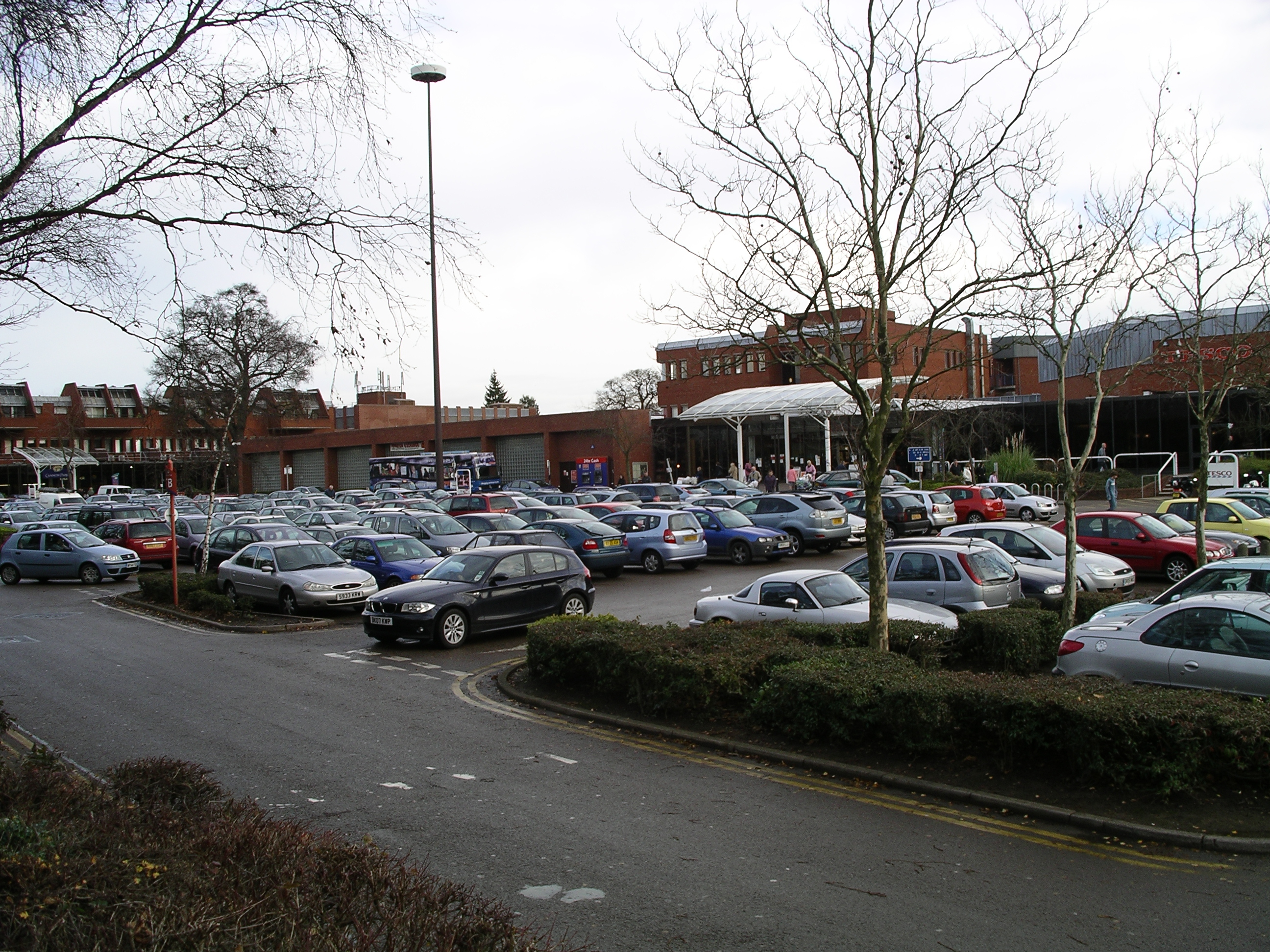
Cannon Park shopping centre (photo 2007)

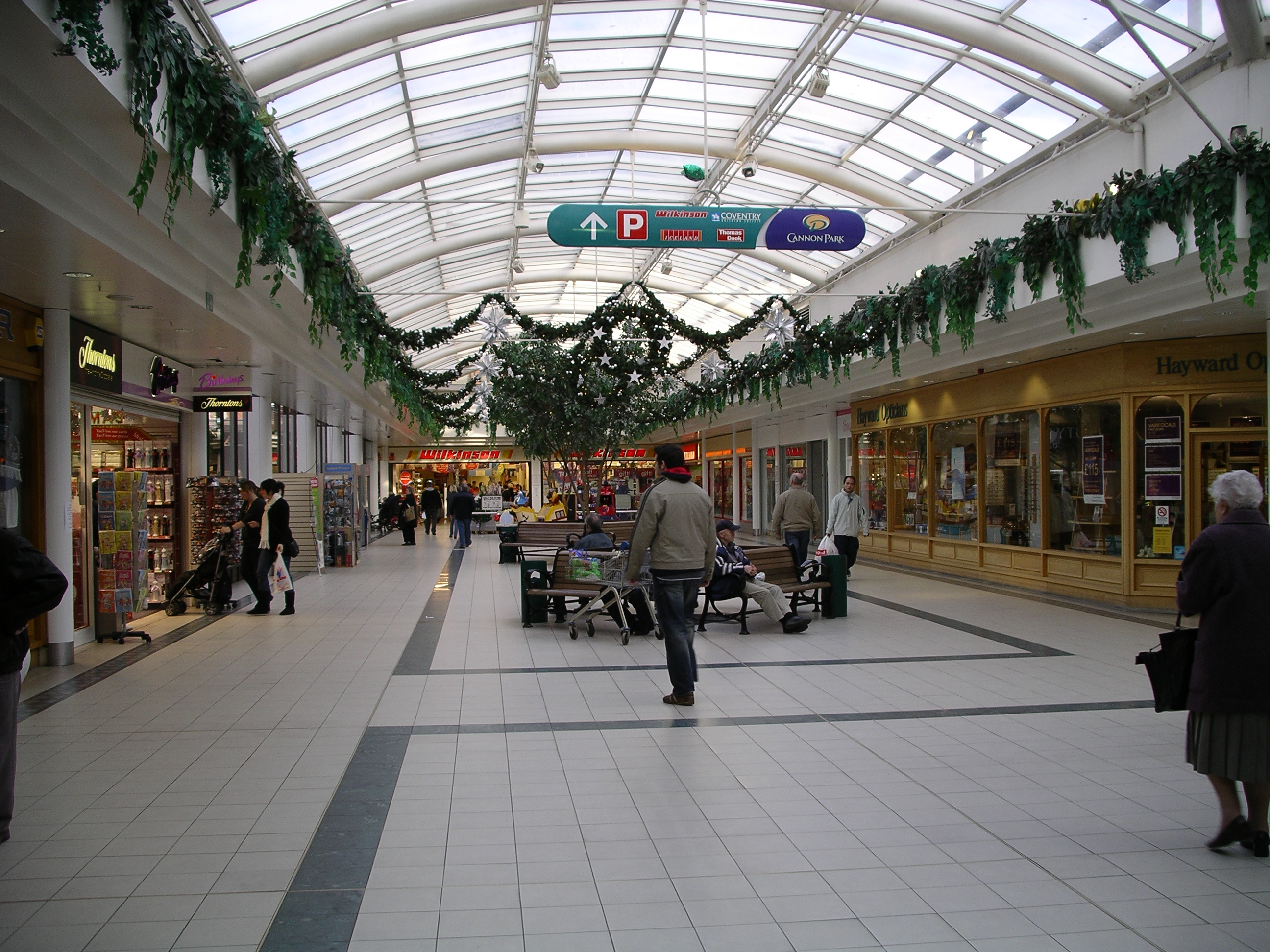
Cannon Park shopping centre – covered walkway with Christmas decorations in December 2007

Cannon Park is a suburb in the south-west of the City of Coventry, West Midlands, England. It can be accessed via the major roads Kenpas Highway (A45) or Kenilworth Road. The area has a sizable shopping centre of the same name (considered 'state-of-the-art' when it opened in 1977) which features food stores, shops and eateries. Tenants include a Post Office, Tesco and Iceland.

The residential area of Cannon Park was developed between the late-1960s and mid-1980s and is considered to be one of the most prosperous districts of the city. The University of Warwick is located directly adjacent to Cannon Park. The suburb is served by Cannon Park Primary School located within it.

It is bounded by the suburbs of Canley to the north and west, Westwood Heath to the south, Cannon Hill to the northeast, and Gibbet Hill to the southeast.

In the late 1970s, a shopping centre was developed on land just off the residential estate, with a branch of Sainsbury's and some smaller stores surrounding it. It was opened by the Lord and Lady Mayoress of Coventry in 1977.

In 2009 plans were mooted to demolish the shopping centre, and replace it with a new one including a significantly larger Tesco Extra store, similar in size to the one at the Ricoh Arena, Coventry. These plans did not come to fruition.
