= Chapelfields =

Suburb of Coventry, England

Coordinates: 52.406°N 1.535°W

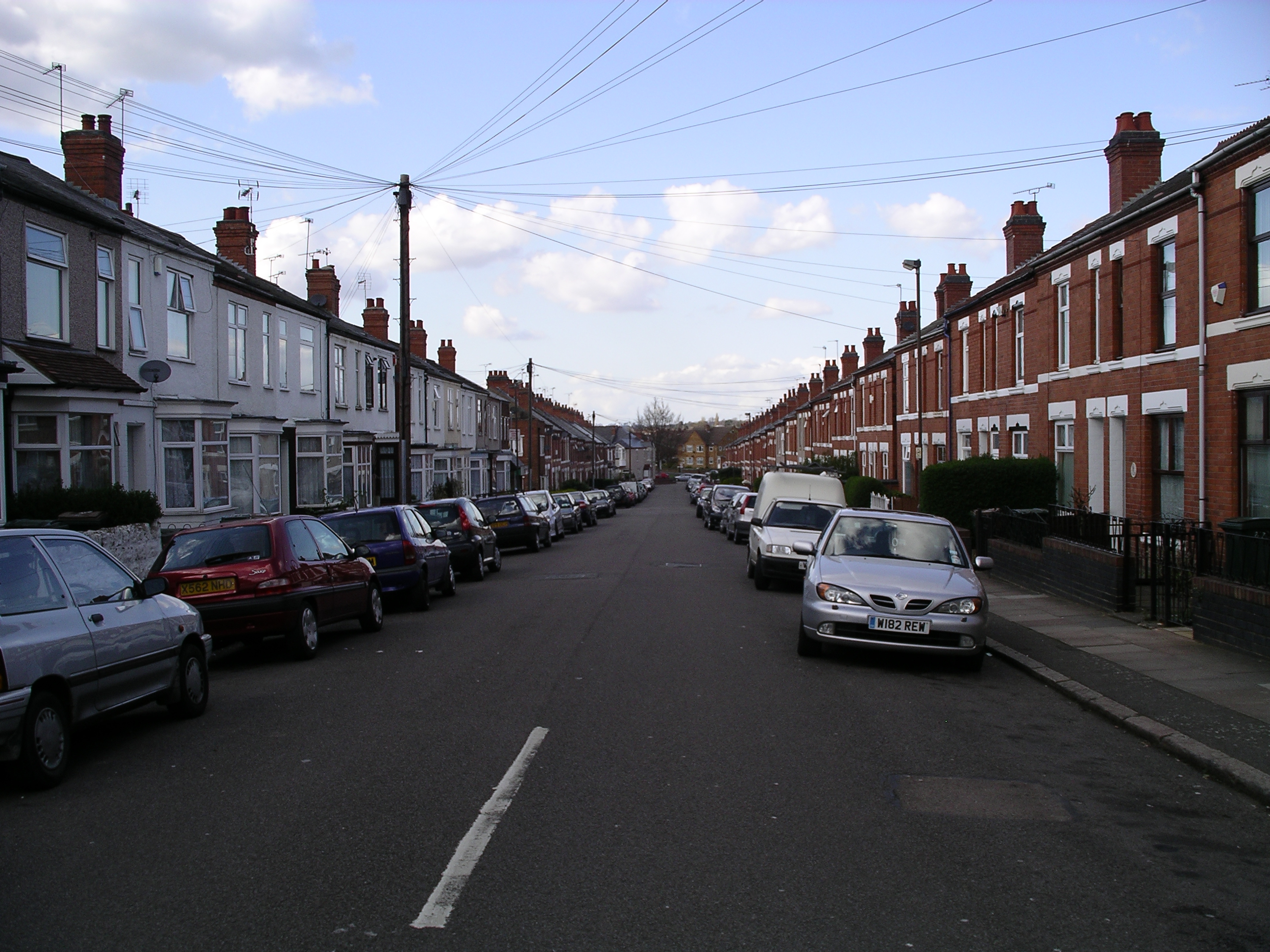
- Sir Thomas White's Rd, Chapelfields (view looking north)
- OS grid reference: SP319781
  - London: 90 mi (140 km)
- Metropolitan borough: Coventry
- Metropolitan county: West Midlands
- Region: West Midlands
- Country: England
- Sovereign state: United Kingdom
- Post town: COVENTRY
- Postcode district: CV5
- Dialling code: 024
- UK Parliament: Coventry South

Chapelfields (also written Chapel Fields) is a suburb of Coventry, West Midlands, England. It is situated about 1.5 miles to the west of Coventry City Centre; bordering Coundon to the north, Earlsdon to the south, Spon End to the east and Whoberley to the west. It is mainly residential, with a high proportion of graduates among the younger residents, and nowadays a significant element of students, particularly those studying at the University of Warwick. Houses in Chapelfields proper are mostly small to medium-sized terraced houses with gardens.

The area originally comprised just a few streets: Craven Street, Mount Street, Lord Street, Duke Street, the southern side of Allesley Old Road, and the northern side of Hearsall Lane; now a conservation area because of its links to the watchmaking industry. However, in the early 20th century the area was developed to the west and now includes streets to the west of Mount Street including Sir Thomas White's Road, Queensland Avenue, Kingsland Avenue, Abercorn Road and Maudslay Road. Although these streets now form part of the modern area known as Chapelfields, some residents and local organisations including the Chapelfields Area Residents and Traders Association (CARTA) do not consider this extended area to be part of Chapelfields.

In mediaeval times there was a lazar house or leper hospital covering part of the area, which had been founded in 1168 by Hugh de Kevelioc, 5th Earl of Chester, for William D'Auney, a knight who had contracted the condition while following Kevelioc in a crusade. The modern area originates in 1847 when, as an extension of the neighbouring Spon area, building commenced to accommodate the watch-making industry for which Coventry was then famous; however, the part of Chapelfields from Sir Thomas White's Road to Maudslay Road was not developed until the early 20th century (Sir Thomas White's Road itself was built in 1908 and formed part of the tram route to Broadgate). It is a quirk of this section of Chapelfields that properties there are subject to restrictive covenants forbidding their use as "fried fish shops", which were prevalent in the area at that time. Another popular type of business in Chapelfields has always been the public house. Though fewer in number, there are still eight licensed premises in this tiny area: the Craven Arms, the Chestnut Tree, the Hearsall Inn, the Coombe Abbey Inn (closed as a pub at the end of 2015), the Craven Club (all in Craven Street), the Maudslay, the Four Provinces (Allesley Old Road, on the corner with Craven Street) and the Nursery Tavern in Lord Street. The last, locally noted as a real ale pub, presumably derives its name from Weare's Nursery, the immediate former occupier of the land upon which Chapelfields was built. Chapelfields pubs no longer extant included the New Inn and the Brewer's Arms in Craven Street, and the Sun Dial in Lord Street.

Within the Chapelfields area is All Souls Catholic Primary School.

Adjacent to the area is Hearsall Common, an open space that was deprived of official common status by the local authority in 1927. In 2007/08 this became the centre of dispute when local residents opposed the council's plans to remove part of the Chapelfields end of the common for bus lanes as part of the "PrimeLines" scheme. The six Conservative councillors for the Earlsdon and Whoberley wards have refused to support the objections and are backing one of their number, council leader Ken Taylor, in his attempts to impose this scheme which is the brainchild of the West Midlands Passenger Transport Executive. A petition was signed by 1,928 local residents opposing the scheme, whilst 29 indicated their support through a consultation with the council. The matter has not been settled at the time of writing, nor are applications by local residents to have the Common officially recognised as a village green to protect it.
