= New Deal for Communities =

New Deal for Communities was a regeneration programme led by the government of the United Kingdom for some of the England's most deprived neighbourhoods. The programme was established by Tony Blair's Labour Government and was overseen by the Neighbourhood Renewal Unit within the Department for Communities and Local Government.

== Local NDC Partnerships ==
Local NDC partnerships were established for each regeneration area to ensure that change was community led. Initially in 1998, 17 local partnerships were announced, later increased in 1999 with the establishment of a second round of 22 partnerships, increasing the total number to 39.

=== Round 1 local partnerships ===
In 1998 local partnerships were agreed for the following local authority areas:

- Birmingham (covering the Kings Norton area)
- Bradford (covering the (Little Horton, Marshfield and West Bowling areas)
- Brighton (covering the East Brighton area)
- Bristol (covering the Barton Hill area)
- Hackney (covering the Shoreditch area)
- Hull (covering the Preston Road area)
- Leicester (covering Braunstone area)
- Liverpool (covering the Kensington area)
- Manchester (covering the Beswick and Openshaw areas)
- Middlesbrough (covering the West Middlesbrough area)
- Newcastle upon Tyne (covering the Arthur's Hill, Cruddas Park, Rye Hill and Elswick areas) - see also New Deal for Communities (Newcastle)
- Newham (covering part of the West Ham and Plaistow areas)
- Norwich (North Earlham, Larkman and Marlpit)
- Nottingham (Radford and Hyson Green)
- Sandwell (Greets Green)
- Southwark (Aylesbury Estate)
- Tower Hamlets (Ocean Estate)

These partnerships stopped receiving funding in 2010.

=== Round 2 local partnerships ===
In 1999 further local partnerships were established within the following local authority areas:

- Birmingham (Aston)
- Brent (South Kilburn)
- Coventry (Wood End, Henley Green and Manor Farm)
- Derby (Derwent)
- Doncaster (Central Doncaster)
- Hammersmith & Fulham (North Fulham)
- Haringey (Seven Sisters)
- Hartlepool (West Central Hartlepool)
- Islington (Finsbury)
- Knowsley (Huyton)
- Lambeth (Clapham Park)
- Lewisham (New Cross Gate)
- Luton (Marsh Farm)
- Oldham (Hathershaw and Fitton Hill)
- Plymouth (Devonport)
- Rochdale (Heywood)
- Salford (Charlestown and Lower Kersal)
- Sheffield (Burngreave)
- Southampton (Thornhill)
- Sunderland (East End and Hendon)
- Walsall (Blakenall Heath)
- Wolverhampton (All Saints and Blakenhall Community Development (ABCD))

These partnerships stopped receiving funding in 2011.

== Outcomes ==
- The Newcastle New Deal for Communities was working to change the face of Newcastle upon Tyne's West End over a ten-year period. Since it began in 2000, the programme has aimed to tackle deprivation in the areas of Arthur's Hill, Cruddas Park, Rye Hill and Elswick, through community-led regeneration. More than 100 projects are aiming to bridge the gap between those communities in the West End and those in wealthier parts of the city. The programme tackled five key themes: poor job prospects; high levels of crime; educational under-achievement; poor health; and problems with housing and the environment. New Deal's commitment to put residents in charge of the area's regeneration is reflected in the organization's structure - the Board of Directors included a majority of twelve elected residents. As of September 2006, recorded crime in the New Deal catchment area had fallen by 21 per cent thanks to a £3.4m package of crime-busting measures.
- One study on health outcomes of the NDC programme found "statistically significant improvements for income, fear of crime and satisfaction with the local area. However, with the exception of satisfaction with the local area, no statistically significant differences in overall change in NDC compared with comparator areas were found."
- An evaluation by the Ministry for Communities and Local Government found "In general NDC areas have narrowed the gaps with the rest of the country." However, the report also acknowledged that some of the improvements were cosmetic, and that "increasing proportions of owner-occupiers will help achieve outcome change and will dilute the scale of problems in regeneration areas; but existing residents in social housing schemes are unlikely to be able to purchase new owneroccupied dwellings".
