= Wyken =

Suburb of Coventry, England

Coordinates: 52.416570°N 1.466527°W

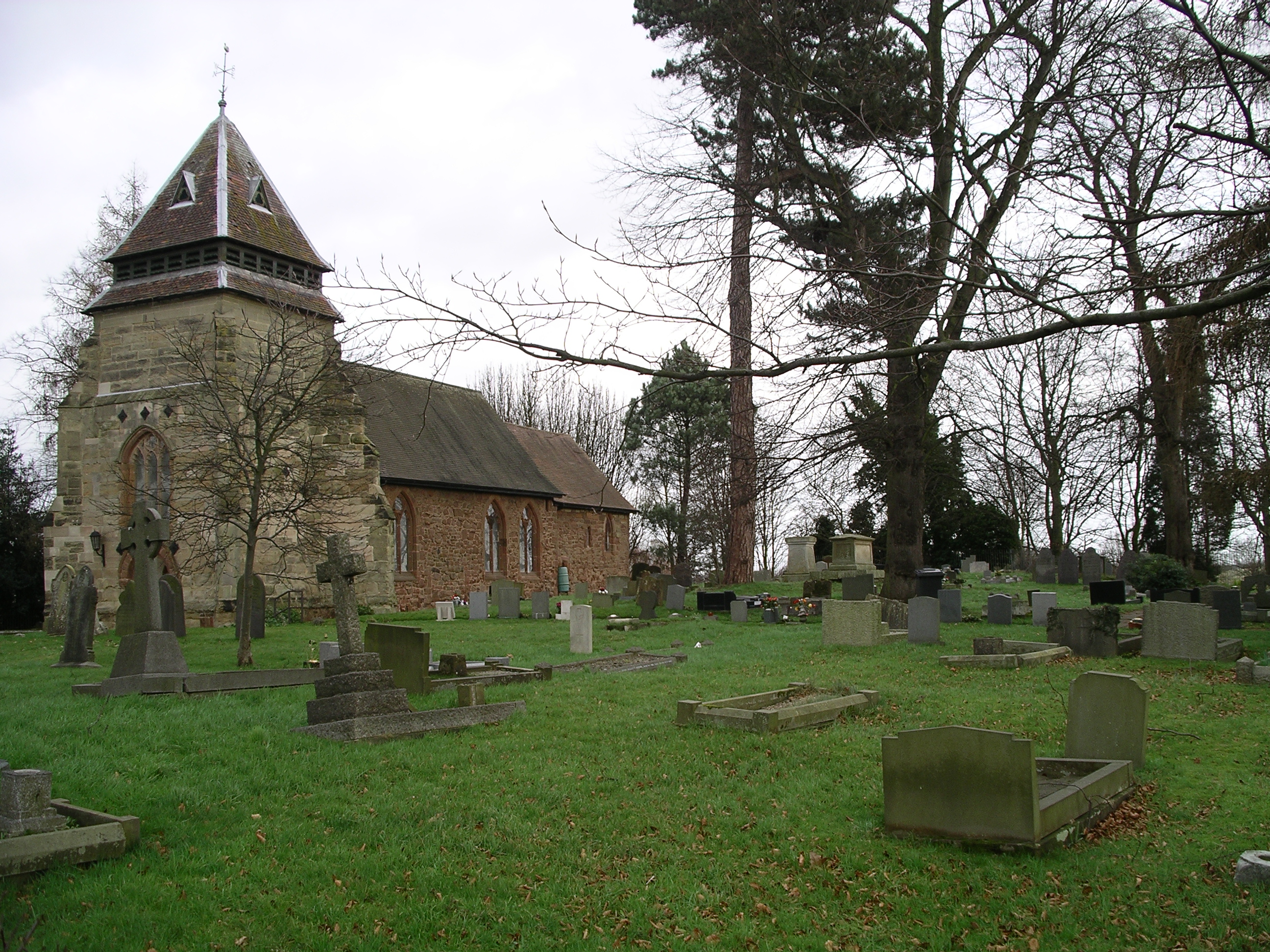
- Church of St Mary Magdalene

- Location within the West Midlands
- Metropolitan borough: Coventry
- Metropolitan county: West Midlands
- Region: West Midlands
- Country: England
- Sovereign state: United Kingdom
- Police: West Midlands
- Fire: West Midlands
- Ambulance: West Midlands

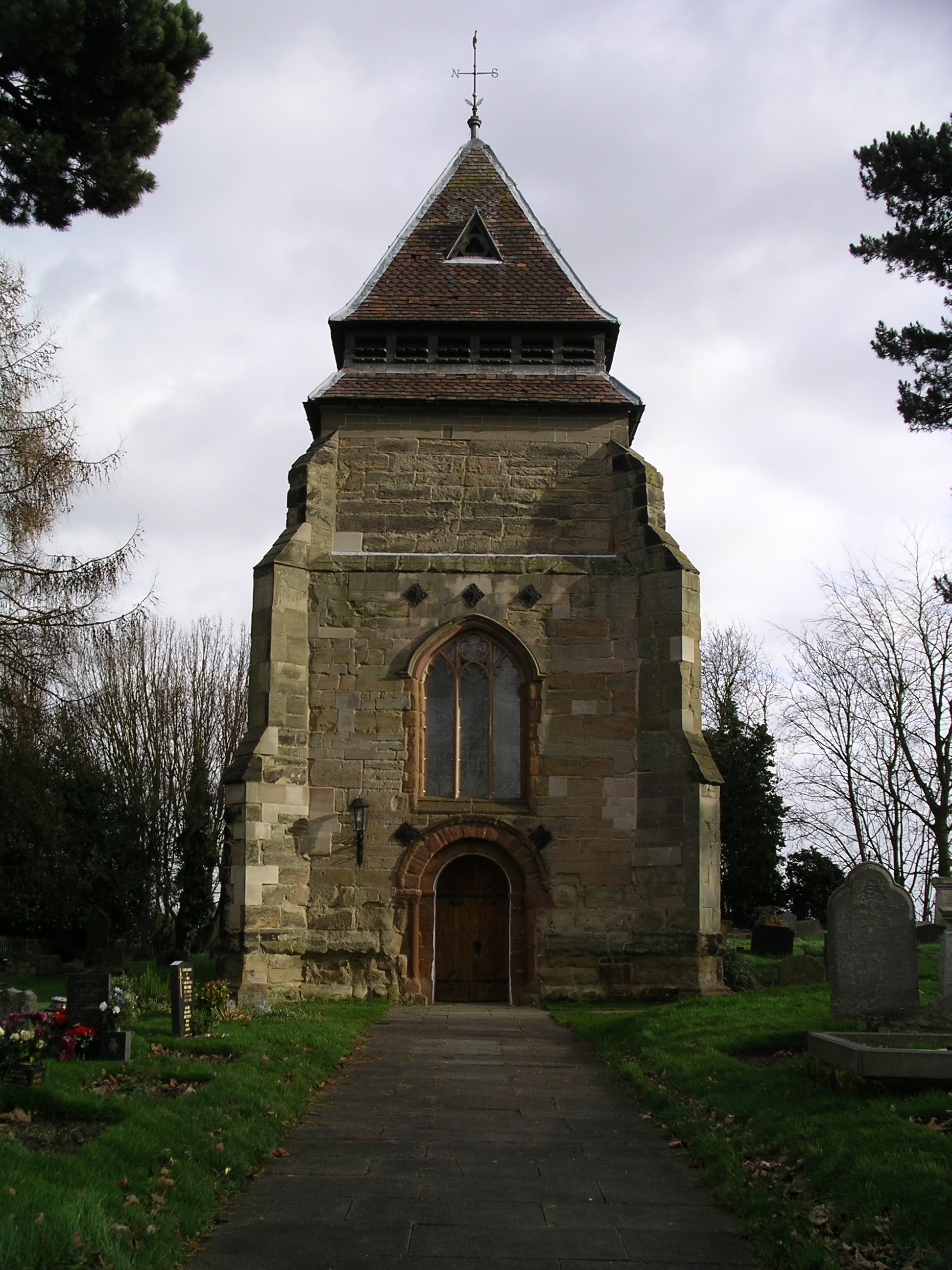
Church of St Mary Magdalene

Wyken, a suburb of Coventry, in the county of the West Midlands, England, is situated between the areas of Stoke and Walsgrave, three miles east-northeast of Coventry city centre. The population of this Coventry Ward taken at the 2011 census was 16,818. It is a fairly large ward spreading as far as the Binley area. The majority of the houses in Wyken are terraced houses.

The original parish ran close to the River Sowe and was mainly flat except for Wyken Heath and Wyken Knob near Stoke Heath.

== History ==
The oldest building within Wyken is Saint Mary Magdalene's Church, located within Wyken Croft, which dates to the early 11th century. The village developed opposite the church and remained a small settlement until the 18th century at which point it began to expand. This original layout has since evolved as Wyken was incorporated into Coventry in 1932 resulting in boundary changes.

In 1931 the civil parish had a population of 3729. On 1 April 1932 the parish was abolished and merged with Coventry and Combe Fields.

== Politics ==
Since 1974, Wyken is a part of the Coventry North East Constituency. The Wyken Ward elects three councillors to Coventry City Council, all three of whom are Labour as at March 2026.

== Local legends ==
The churchyard of St Mary Magdalene's church has been known to generations of residents as the site of a pirate grave dating to some time in the 19th century. The legend had it that to summon the spectre one had to run around the grave three times. This legend later evolved to running around the church itself three times followed by throwing a stone through the windows of the church, which led to the removal of the headstone by the vicar of the parish in the 1960s. It is also said to be the birthplace of St George in Caludon Castle, of which only one wall remains.

== Churches and schools ==
St Mary Magdalene's is regarded as the oldest surviving church in Coventry, with its origins dating back approximately 900 years. Together with the nearby Church of the Risen Christ, it forms a single ministry, expressed through two buildings but one worshipping community. Both churches sit within a wider group of historic Anglican parishes that also includes the Church of the Holy Cross in Wyken and St Michael’s in Stoke.

Secondary schools in the area are Caludon Castle School and Lyng Hall School.

== Notable residents ==
- Professional footballer Luke McCormick grew up in the district attending St John Fisher Catholic Primary School.
- Professional footballer Ian Evatt grew up in the area attending Caludon Castle.
- Actor Ron Cook grew up in the area attending Caludon Castle.
- MotoGP rider Cal Crutchlow grew up in Wyken.
- Professional darts player Mark McGeeney was born in Wyken.
- Retired professional basketball player and owner of the Coventry Crusaders Robert "Dip" Donaldson previously lived in Wyken.
- Comedian and actor Guz Khan currently lives with his wife and children in this area.
