= Ernesford Grange =

Suburb of Coventry, West Midlands, England

Coordinates: 52.395°N 1.458°W

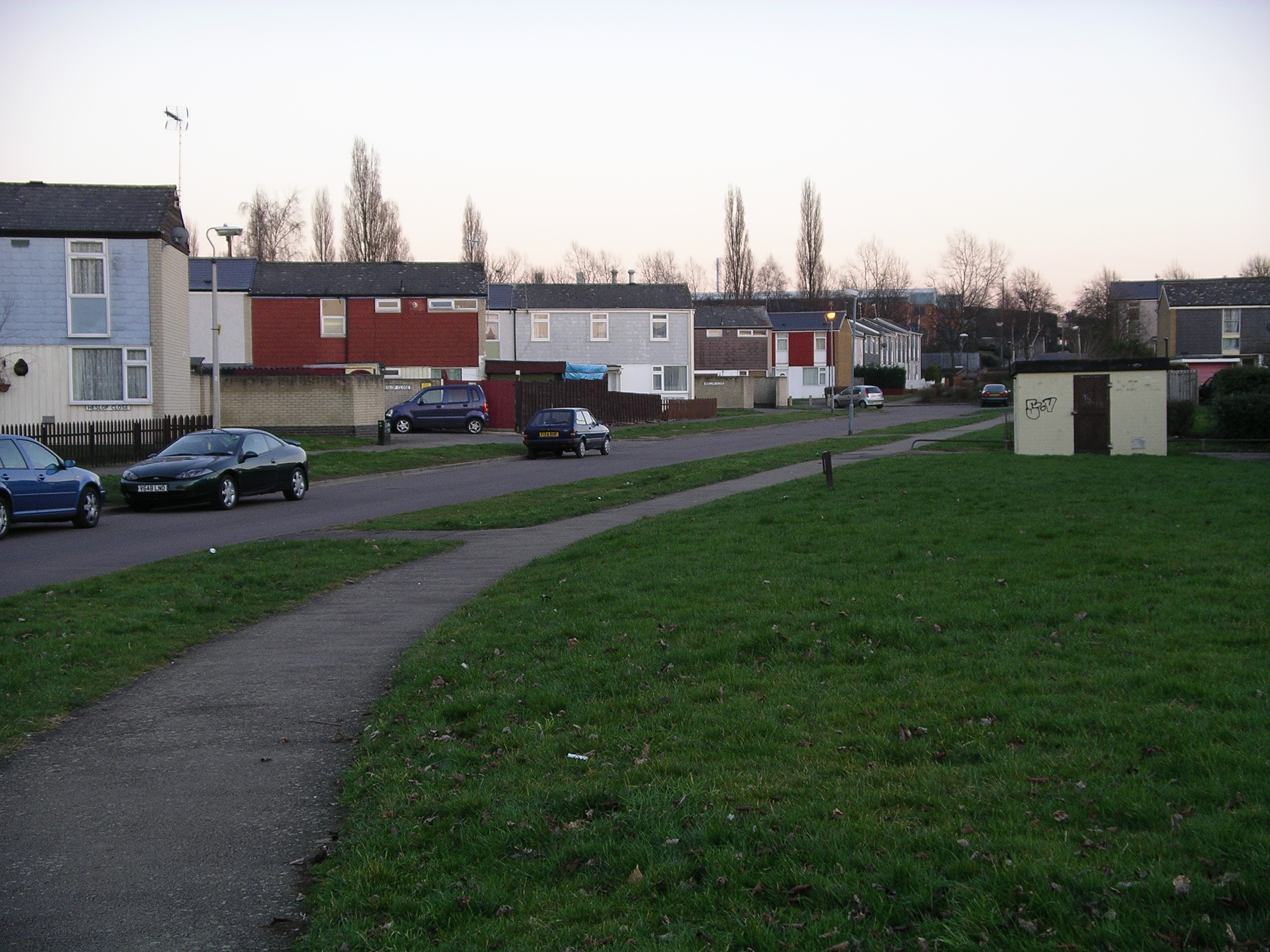
Invictor Road, Earnsford Grange, Coventry, England

Ernesford Grange is a suburb of Coventry, West Midlands. It is in the southeast of the city and borders the Binley, Stoke Aldermoor and Willenhall areas. It is part of the Coventry South Constituency.

The district was built in the 1960s and the 1970s with a three phase housing estate. Many of the closes in phase 2 and phase 3 of the council estates are named after managers who worked in the Binley Colliery.

The Alan Higgs Centre, which opened in 2004 just outside the district on Allard Way, has a 50 metre long swimming pool.

Binley Little Woods sits squarely in the middle of the phase 1 closes. It is a protected site and is known for its extensive annual display of bluebells in May.

== History ==
Ernesford is mentioned under Binley in William Dugdale's The Antiquities of Warwickshire Illustrated published in 1656 and Ernesford Grange is noted as at one time belonging to the Abby of Combe. Ernesford Grange moated site was listed in 1954 as an ancient monument under the Ancient Monuments Act 1931 and reclassified as a scheduled monument under the Ancient Monuments and Archaeological Areas Act 1979. The site, in the grounds of Ernesford Grange Community Academy, has been partly excavated. In 1971, the foundations of an 'L'-shaped building were discovered consisting of a hall, a kitchen where two circular ovens were found, a chamber and a garderobe.

== Education ==
Ernesford Grange is served by four primary schools: Ernesford Grange, Corpus Christi Catholic, Sowe Valley and St Bartholomew's Church of England. Ernesford Grange Community Academy is the senior school, next to which is Riverbank Academy, a special education school.
