= Henley College Coventry =

- Henley College after modernisation

Location
- Henley Road; Coventry, CV2 1ED; England
- 52.4323°N 1.4688°W

Information
- Type: Further education college
- Motto: Student First
- Established: 1964
- Closed: 2021
- Department for Education URN: 130472 Tables
- Principal: Ray Goy
- Gender: Mixed
- Age: 14+
- Enrolment: 5,000 (part-time), 1,600 (full-time)
- Website: http://www.coventrycollege.ac.uk/

Henley College was a further education college in the city of Coventry, England. Established in 1964, it was one of three further education colleges within the city boundaries, alongside City College Coventry (now Coventry College), and Hereward College, before its merger in 2017 with City College to become Coventry College. The campus is located to the north of Coventry city centre and is close to the M6 motorway in a sub area of Bell Green. Graduation ceremonies were held at Coventry Cathedral.

== History ==
=== 2012 expansion ===
After plans to extensively renovate the college failed in 2009 due to lack of funding, the college was given permission to begin a £6million revamp and expansion in October 2012, replacing the college's original 1960s structures with more modern facilities.

=== Closure ===
The college closed in 2021, when the building was considered to be in a general state of disrepair and could not be improved due to insufficient funding. The site was subsequently used for emergency services training and served as a filming location for the BBC drama series Phoenix Rise.

== Courses ==
The college enrolled about 6,000 students per year and had both Further Education and Higher Educations courses which included: Applied, Medical, and Forensic Science, Beauty Therapy, Business and Professional Studies, Criminology, Childcare and Education, Computing, Games Design, Engineering, Hairdressing, Health and Social Care, Sports and Exercise Sciences, and Travel and Tourism.

== Fire ==
On the evening of 29 April 2025, a significant fire engulfed the former Henley College building located on Henley Road in the Bell Green area of Coventry, England. The blaze commenced around 7:15 PM, producing thick plumes of black smoke visible across the city. At its peak, approximately 75 firefighters from the West Midlands and Staffordshire fire services were deployed to combat the inferno.

The fire caused extensive damage, affecting approximately 70% of the structure and leading to the collapse of significant portions of the roof. In response to safety concerns, a nearby electrical substation was temporarily shut down, resulting in power outages for some residents.

Emergency services advised local residents to keep windows and doors closed due to the hazardous smoke. Henley Road remained closed to vehicles as firefighting efforts continued into the following day. Fire investigation officers were dispatched to determine the cause of the blaze. Four teenagers were arrested on suspicion of arson, being 2 boys aged 15 and 16 and 2 girls aged 15 and 16. As at 1 May 2025, investigations into the cause of the fire were ongoing. While the ultimate future of the site remained uncertain, the college buildings were demolished in August 2025.

In the 4 June 2026, the four teenagers, 2 boys aged 15 and 16, and a 16 year old girl pleded not guilty while the fourth girl, aged 15 had no indication of a plea at Coventry Magistrates Court. According to the BBC News, it mentioned the four teenagers were charged with arson to the College. The defendants who are unnamed (under 17 as of source published), were bailed and will due to be appearing in court at the 17 September 2026.

== Notable alumni ==
Notable alumni include:

- Aimee Challenor – British politician and transgender activist
- Marlon Devonish MBE – 100 metre and 200 metre sprint athlete
- Colleen Fletcher – Former Member of Parliament
- Chris Kirkland – footballer
- Darius Vassell – footballer
- Adam Whitehead – swimmer
