= Potters Green =

Suburb of Coventry, West Midlands, England

Coordinates: 52.433°N 1.457°W

Potters Green (Potter's Green on Ordnance Survey maps) is a mainly residential suburb in the northeast of the city of Coventry, West Midlands, England. The longest road is Woodway Lane, while the road used by through traffic is Ringwood Highway, which provides a link between Woodway Lane, Wigston Road and Deedmore Road.

It is not home to any leisure centres, but is close to the NDC's one (opened March 2009). Potters Green is home to several shops, a post office, various take-away shops, and two pubs close to waste ground, home to Sunday League football. There are no large businesses in Potters Green but it is close to the Alderman's Green industrial estate and the M6. It is home to St. Phillips Church.

Potters Green Primary School, Grace Academy School (formerly Woodway Park School) and Cardinal Wiseman Catholic School are within Potters Green.
