= Brownshill Green =

Coordinates: 52.441°N 1.551°W

Brownshill Green is a suburban hamlet 3.5 miles northwest of Coventry by road, adjacent to the suburbs of Allesley, Coundon and Keresley. It is bordered on its north side by the northern boundary of Coventry and the Warwickshire village of Corley. Its main thoroughfare is Brownshill Green Road, which runs from its junction with Coundon Wedge Drive in the north to join Keresley Road in the south.

Brownshill Green is a semi-rural residential area with much housing taking the form of traditional 20th century terrace or semi-detached styles. Nearby schools are generally regarded as being in the suburbs of Keresley (Keresley Grange Primary School) or Coundon (Coundon Court School). The area is also known for being the home of a large and well-established garden centre.

Brownshill Green Road has the postcodes of CV6 2AQ, CV6 2DT, CV6 2DU, CV6 2AR, CV6 2EG, CV6 2AP, CV6 2AS, CV6 2DW, CV6 2EF, CV6 2AN, CV6 2AQ, CV6 2DT, CV6 2DU, CV6 2AR, CV6 2EG, CV6 2AP, CV6 2AS, CV6 2DW, CV6 2EF and CV6 2AN. As the crown flies, it is 88.79 miles northwest of central London, 2.14 miles northwest of Coventry city centre, 15.69 miles east of central Birmingham and 22.1 miles southwest of Leicester city centre.

In keeping with the semirural nature of the area, the speed limit on several main roads is 40mph rather than the usual 30mph found in built-up residential areas. However, a combination of the lack of a direct bus service and the proximity of classified roads in the area means that traffic is often much slower than this, particularly during the rush hour.
