= Stoke Aldermoor =

Suburb of Coventry, England

Coordinates: 52.395691°N 1.478195°W

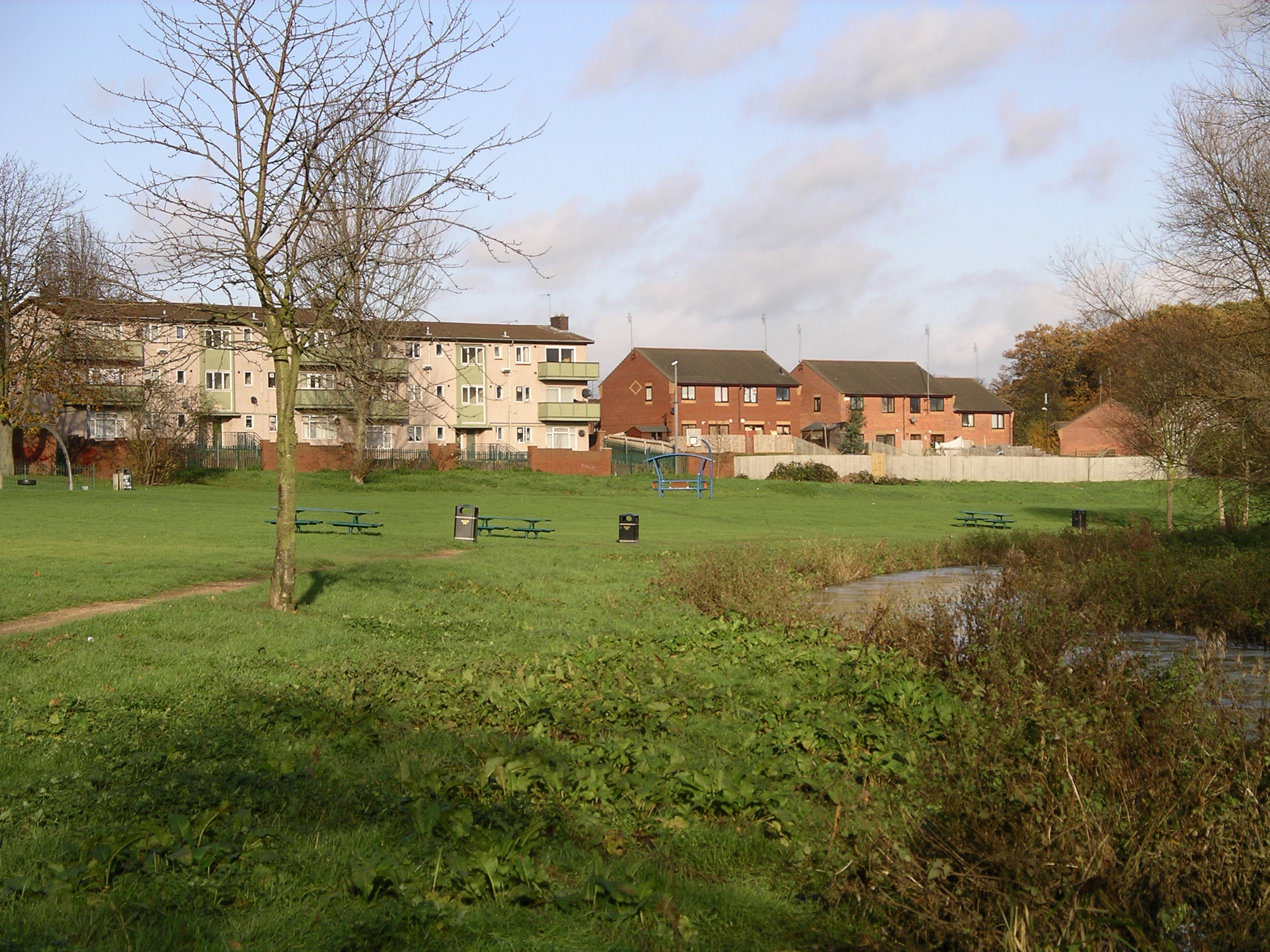
Stoke Aldermoor and Pinley Fields by the River Sowe

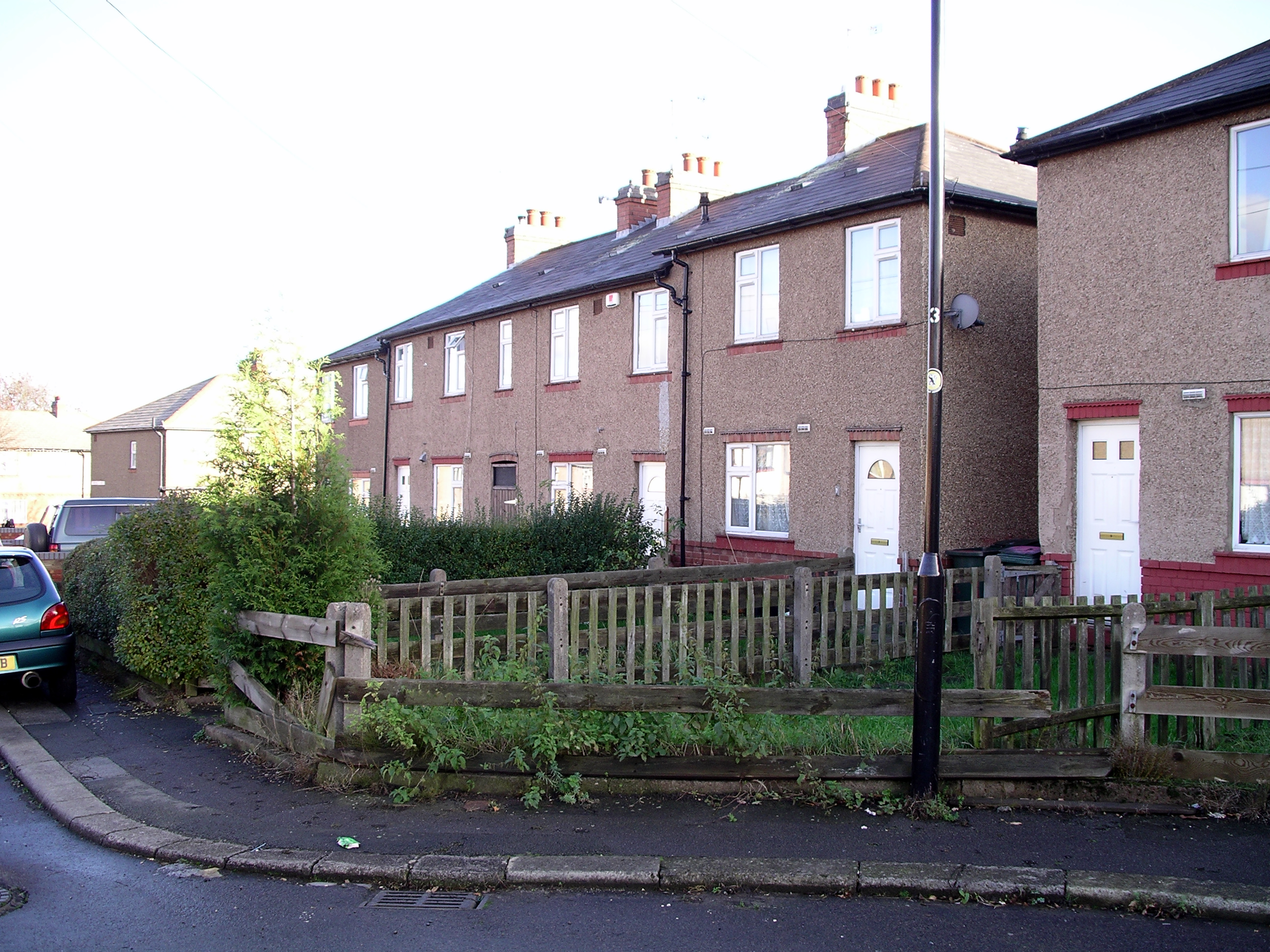
The terrace used in Keeping up Appearances, where Onslow, Daisy and Rose lived.

Stoke Aldermoor is a suburban community in south-eastern Coventry, West Midlands, England. An area of Stoke Aldermoor consisting of a small estate alongside the north-east of Pinley Fields is called Pinley. It is bordered by the River Sowe and the Coventry Canal, and the suburbs of Stoke to the north, Whitley to the south-west and Ernesford Grange to the east.

== Industry ==
During the Second World War, the Rootes No 1 Shadow Factory was located in Stoke Aldermoor. Four-wheel-drive scout cars, tank engines, truck engines and aero engines were produced at the factory. Rootes also maintained a training school in the area. The factory was more recently used as the Peugeot UK head office until they relocated to new purpose-built premises a short distance away in Pinley in 2008.

== Politics ==
Stoke Aldermoor sits in the city council ward of Lower Stoke, which has historically been represented by Labour, consistently and safely from the mid-2000s.

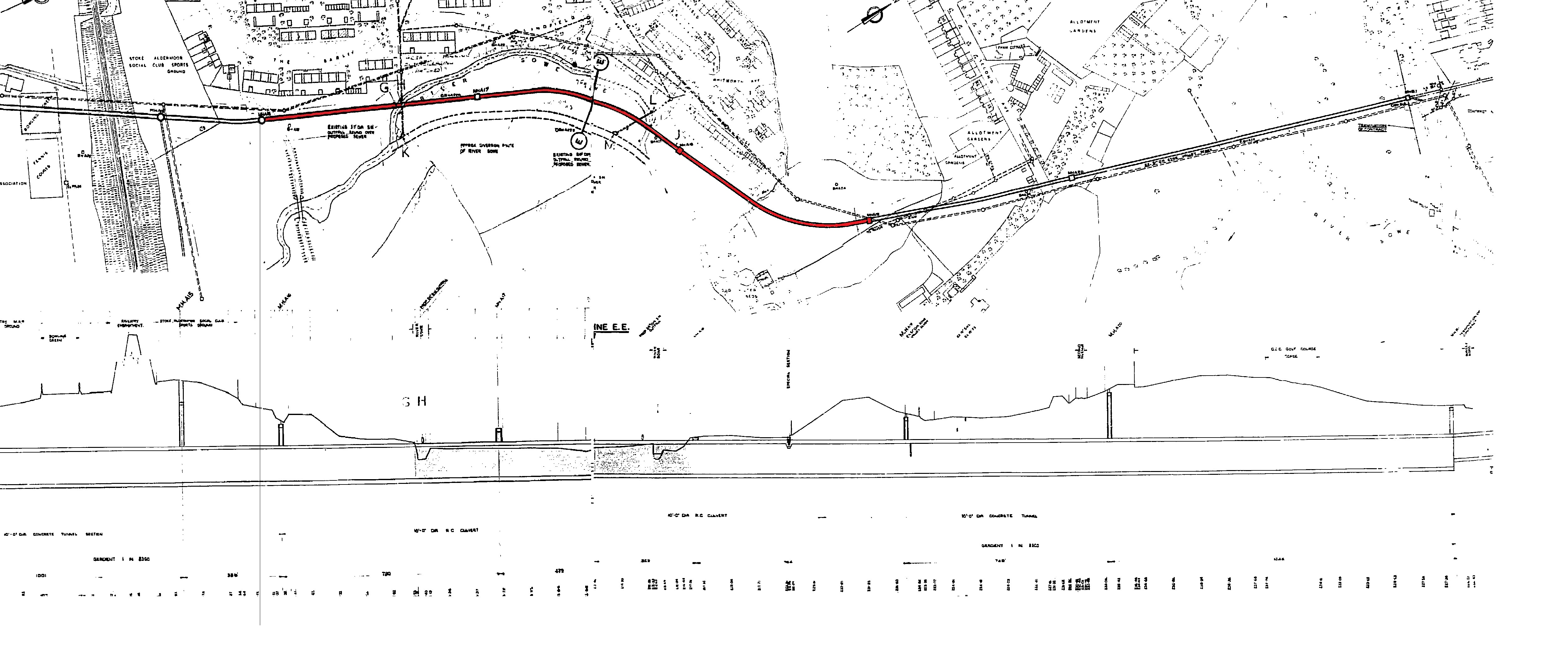
The sewer used for the making of The Italian Job

== In popular culture ==
Stoke Aldermoor is where the famous Mini sewer chase was shot for the film The Italian Job (1969). The Minis were lowered into the newly built sewers on the outskirts of Stoke Aldermoor and driven to the Finham Sewage Works.

In the television series Keeping Up Appearances, exterior shots around Daisy and Onslow's council house were filmed in Stoke Aldermoor.
