= Alderman's Green =

Area of Coventry, England

Coordinates: 52.44°N 01.48°W

- Location within the West Midlands
- OS grid reference: SP3583
- Unitary authority: Coventry
- Metropolitan county: West Midlands
- Region: West Midlands
- Country: England
- Sovereign state: United Kingdom
- Police: West Midlands
- Fire: West Midlands
- Ambulance: West Midlands

Aldermans Green is an area in the north east of Coventry, England. It is situated in between Longford and Bell Green. Prior to the expansion of Coventry it was a small village.

== School ==
- Alderman's Green Community School
