= Bell Green =

Area of West Midlands, England

Coordinates: 52.4348°N 1.4728°W

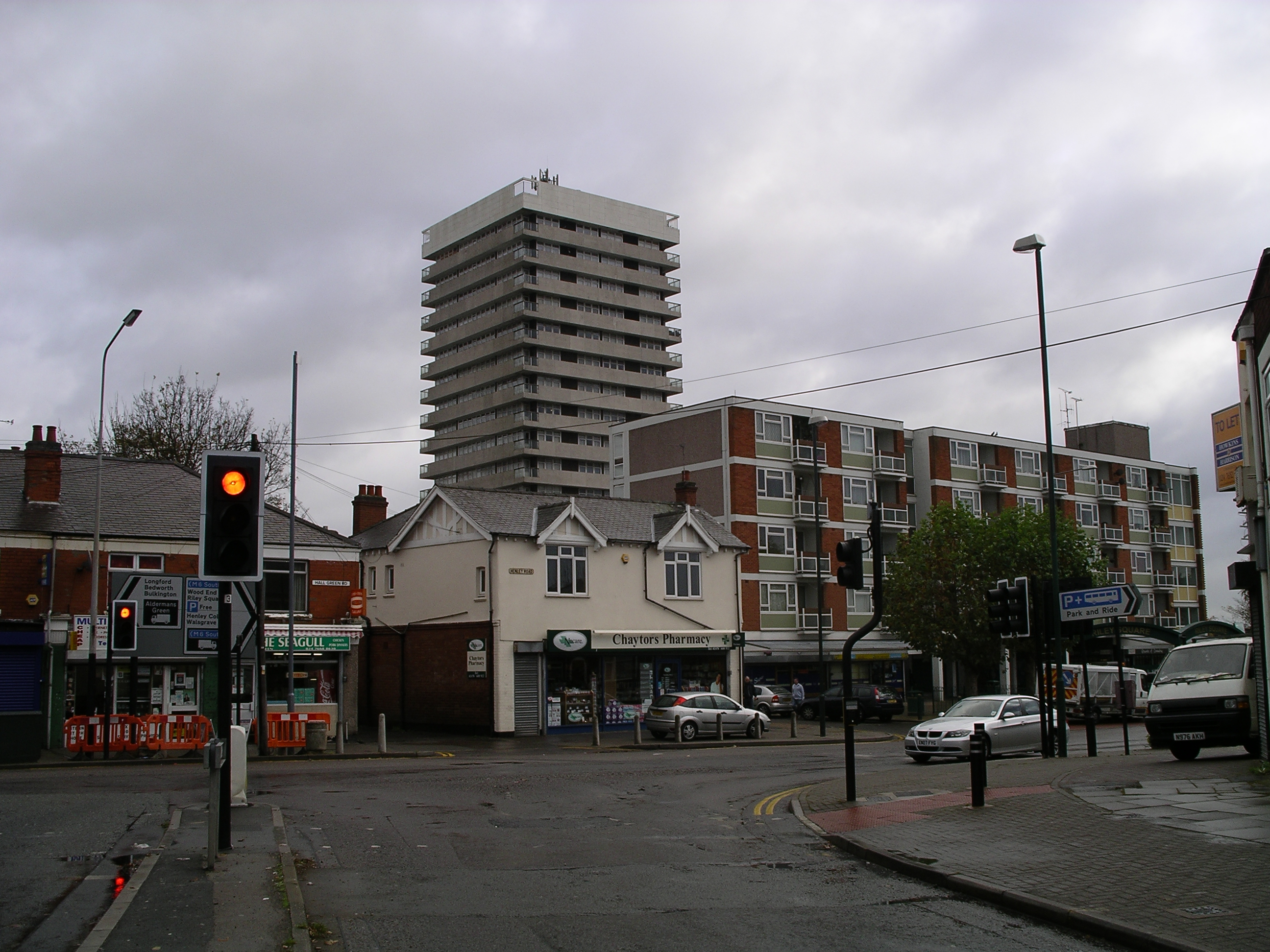
- The northern end of Bell Green Road. Dewis House is the 17-storey block of flats in the background.

- Location within the West Midlands
- Metropolitan county: West Midlands
- Region: West Midlands
- Country: England
- Sovereign state: United Kingdom
- Post town: COVENTRY
- Postcode district: CV2
- Dialling code: 024

Bell Green is predominantly a residential area in the north-east of Coventry, West Midlands, England, about 2.5 miles from the city centre.

== Riley Square ==
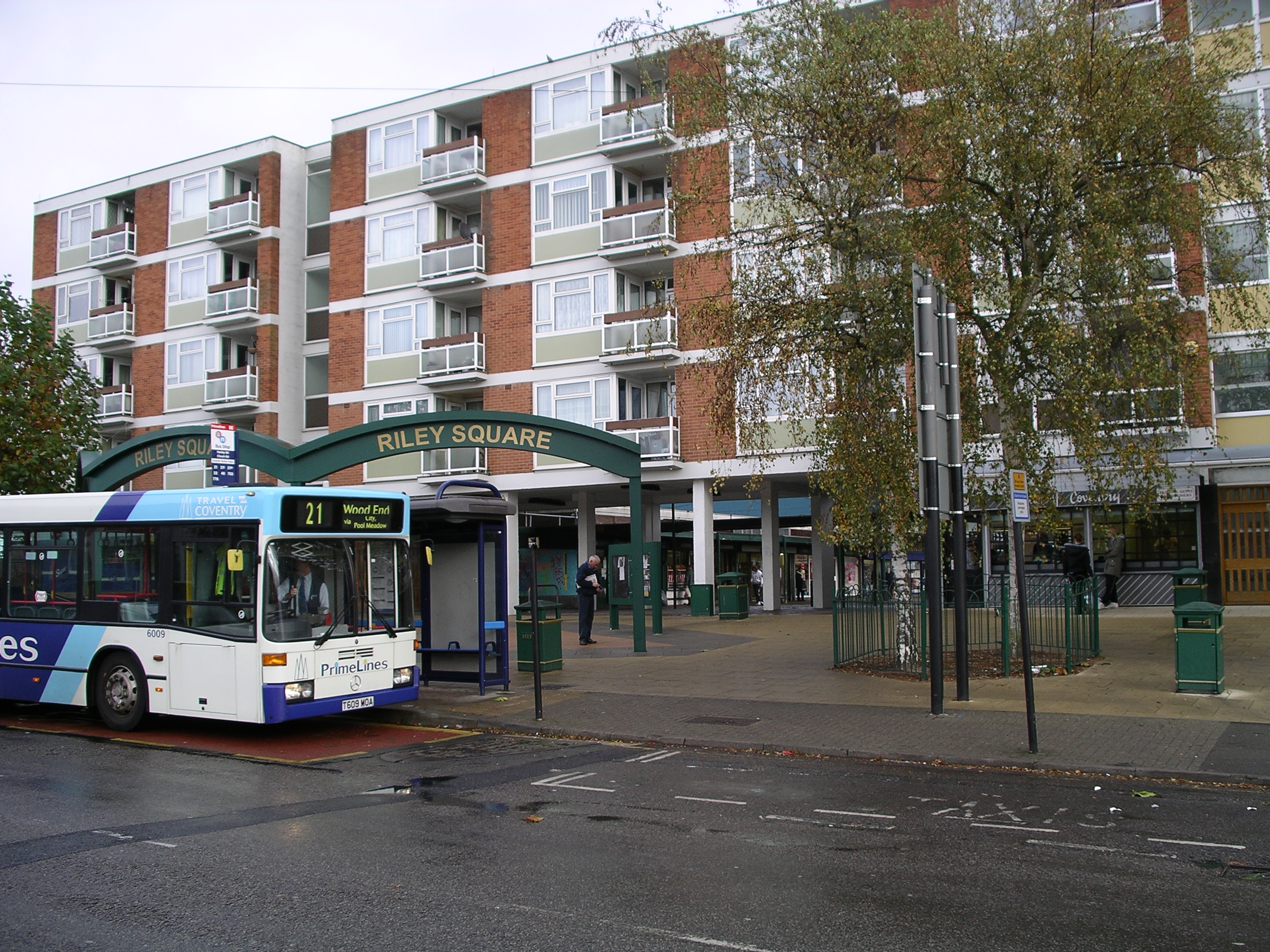
One of the entrances to Riley Square, and a number 21 bus on Henley Road.

Bell Green has a shopping centre called Riley Square, which has a variety of shops surrounded by flats. The public library. formerly located in the Square, was relocated to Park Edge Community Hub. Bell Green health centre is situated just outside Riley Square. Bell Green has high levels of social and economic deprivation and has experienced significant problems with low-level crime and antisocial behaviour, however, the crime rate is relatively low compared to neighbouring districts such as Wood End and Manor House.

== Dewis House ==
The Riley Square estate was built between 1957 and 1965 to the designs of the City Architect's Department under Arthur Ling. Dewis House, a 17-storey block of flats about 51 metres (167 ft) tall, is situated in Riley Square. Completed in 1965, it contains 94 flats.

== Henley College Coventry ==
Henley College Coventry, was built in the 1960s and provides education to over 5,000 part-time students and 1,600 full-time students. The college is located on Henley Road, at the edge of Bell Green.

The college closed in 2021 and the buildings were demolished following a serious fire in the refurbished building in the summer of 2025.
