= Primrose Hill (disambiguation) =

Primrose Hill is a park in London, England.

Primrose Hill may also refer to:

== Places ==
=== United Kingdom ===
- Primrose Hill (district), a district east of Primrose Hill in London, England
- Primrose Hill (ward), a ward of the London Borough of Camden
- Primrose Hill, Dudley, West Midlands, England
- Primrose Hill, Huddersfield, In Huddersfield , West Yorkshire, England
- Primrose Hill Road, a street in Primrose Hill, London
- Primrose Hill railway station, a former railway station at Primrose Hill, London
- Primrose Hill Park, in Coventry

=== Elsewhere ===
- Primrose Hill (Annapolis, Maryland), a historic home in the United States
- Primrose Hill (Hong Kong), a private housing estate in Tai Wo Hau, Tsuen Wan, Hong Kong

== Ships ==
- SS Primrose Hill, a catapult-armed merchant ship built in 1941 and sunk in 1942
- Primrose Hill (barque), a sailing barque built in 1886 and wrecked in 1900
- SS Samflora or SS Primrose Hill, a Liberty ship built in 1943 and scrapped in 1968

== Films ==
- Primrose Hill, a 2007 film by Mikhaël Hers

== Songs ==
- "Primrose Hill", a 1946 song by Charlie Chester, Ken Morris and Everett Lynton
- "Primrose Hill", a 1969 song by Kathe Green from Run the Length of Your Wildness
- "Primrose Hill", a 1970 song by John and Beverley Martyn from The Road to Ruin
- "Primrose Hill", a 1998 song by Loudon Wainwright III
- "North West Three", a 2004 song by Fatboy Slim from Palookaville
- "Primrose Hill", a song by Madness from their 1982 album The Rise & Fall
- "Primrose Hill", a 2024 song by James McCartney, co-written by Sean Ono Lennon
