= The Passengers of the Night =

- Release poster
- French: Les Passagers de la nuit
- Directed by: Mikhaël Hers
- Screenplay by: Mikhaël Hers; Maude Ameline; Mariette Désert
- Produced by: Pierre Guyard
- Starring: Charlotte Gainsbourg; Quito Rayon-Richter; Noée Abita; Megan Northam; Thibault Vinçon; Emmanuelle Béart; Laurent Poitrenaux; Didier Sandre
- Cinematography: Sébastien Buchmann
- Edited by: Marion Monnier
- Music by: Anton Sanko
- Production companies: Nord-Ouest Films; Arte France Cinéma
- Distributed by: Pyramide Films
- Release dates: 13 February 2022 (Berlin); 4 May 2022 (France)
- Running time: 111 minutes
- Country: France
- Language: French

The Passengers of the Night (French: Les Passagers de la nuit) is a 2022 French drama film directed by Mikhaël Hers, co-written by Hers, Maude Ameline and Mariette Désert. Starring Charlotte Gainsbourg, Quito Rayon-Richter, Noée Abita and Megan Northam, it follows a newly divorced mother of two teenagers who meets a troubled teenager girl during the night of the 1981 French presidential election and its following days.

The film had its world premiere in the Main Competition of the 72nd Berlin International Film Festival on 13 February 2022, where it was nominated for the Golden Bear. It was theatrically released in France on 4 May 2022 by Pyramide Films.

== Cast ==
- Charlotte Gainsbourg as Élisabeth
- Quito Rayon-Richter as Matthias
- Noée Abita as Talulah
- Megan Northam as Judith
- Thibault Vinçon as Hugo
- Emmanuelle Béart as Vanda Dorval
- Laurent Poitrenaux as Manuel Agostini
- Didier Sandre as Jean
- Lilith Grasmug as Leïla
- Calixte Broisin-Doutaz as Carlos
- Éric Feldman as Domi
- Ophélia Kolb as Marie-Paule
- Raphaël Thiéry as Francis
- Zoé Bruneau as The Teacher

== Reception ==
On review aggregator website Rotten Tomatoes, the film holds an approval rating of 91%, based on eleven reviews, and an average rating of 7.50/10. On Metacritic, the film has a weighted average score of 72 out of 100, based on seven critics, indicating "generally favorable reviews".
