= Willenhall (disambiguation) =

Willenhall may refer to:

- Willenhall, Walsall, West Midlands
  - Willenhall F.C., former football club
  - Willenhall Town F.C., current football club
- Willenhall, Coventry
