= Raphaël Thiéry =

French actor

- Occupation: Actor
- Years active: 2009–present

Raphaël Thiéry is a French actor.

== Theater ==
Year	Title	Author	Director
2009–2015	Métallos et dégraisseurs	Patrick Grégoire	Patrick Grégoire
2012–2015	Écoute donc voir...	Patrick Grégoire	Patrick Grégoire
2017	La Disparition du soleil	Paul Francesconi	Rachel André
2017	Les tritons prendront l’avion	Patrick Grégoire	Marie-Hélène Garnier & Patrick Grégoire
2017–2018	Métallos et dégraisseurs	Patrick Grégoire	Patrick Grégoire
2018–2019	Écoute donc voir...	Patrick Grégoire	Patrick Grégoire

== Filmography ==
=== Cinema ===
Year	Title	Role	Director	Notes
2016	Staying Vertical	Jean-Louis	Alain Guiraudie	
2017	Ce qui nous tient	The hunter	Yann Chemin	Short
2018	Amanda	Moïse	Mikhaël Hers	
2018	Les déguns	The peasant	Cyrille Droux & Claude Zidi Jr.	
2018	Close Enemies	Curro Reyes	David Oelhoffen	
2018	19 juin	The mover	Anaïs Tellenne	Short
2018	Tout seul	Captain	Antoine Laurens	Short
2018	Bleu reine	Georges	Sarah Al Atassi	Short
2018	Le mal bleu	Jean-Lous	Zoran Boukherma & Anaïs Tellenne	Short
2018	Modern Jazz		Anaïs Tellenne	Short
2018	Gueule d'Isère	Tistan	Esther Mysius & Camille Rouaud	Short
2019	Le coeur de Pierre	Pierre	Olivier Binder	Short
2019	Des feux inexplicables	Michel	Danny Gopnik	Short
2020	Fario	The fish farmer	Gérard Jumel	
2020	Sous les étoiles de Paris	The docker	Claus Drexel	
2020	Corine	Gérard	Emile Phelizot	Short
2020	La biche	The painter	Jennifer Lumbroso	Short
2020	Mauvais genre	Cinema Manager	Sarah Al Atassi	Short
2021	De nos frères blessés	Charles Lainné	Hélier Cisterne	
2021	Vidange		Guillaume Chevalier	Short
2021	Avant que les lumières s'éteignent		Wilmarc Val	Short
2022	La dégustation	Roger	Ivan Calbérac	
2022	The Passengers of the Night	Francis	Mikhaël Hers	
2022	Carné·e·s		Léo Jean-Deschênes	Short
2023	Scarlet	Raphaël	Pietro Marcello	
2023	Poor Things	Saveur the Butcher	Yorgos Lanthimos	
2023	Becs et Ongles	Tom	Xavier Demoulin	Short
2024	L'homme d'argile	Raphaël	Anaïs Tellenne	
2024	La passion selon Karim	Jean-Pierre	Axel Wursten	Short
2024	Les brebis ne savent pas nager	Joseph	Matthieu Allart	Short
TBA	Seul le chien	Antoine	Arsène Besson	Short
TBA	Selon Joy		Camille Lugan	
TBA	Dans cette nuit peuplée		Isabelle Prim	
TBA	La plus précieuse des marchandises		Michel Hazanavicius	
TBA	Tornado		John Maclean	Filming
TBA	Le Domaine		Giovanni Aloi	Filming

=== Television ===
Year	Title	Role	Director	Notes
2014	Le sang de la vigne	Georges Montclart	Aruna Villiers	TV series (1 episode)
2018	La révolte des innocents	Vincenot	Philippe Niang	TV movie
2020	Le Voyageur	Luc Frerot	Stéphanie Murat	TV series (1 episode)
2020	Family Business	Gervais	Igor Gotesman	TV series (1 episode)
2021	Le bruit des trousseaux	Larue	Philippe Claudel	TV movie
2021	Gone for Good	Ostertag's Father	Juan Carlos Medina	TV mini-series
2021	Germinal	Dansaert	David Hourrègue	TV series (1 episode)
2021	Paris Police 1900	Mimile	Julien Despaux	TV series (2 episodes)
