= Willenhall, Coventry =

Suburb of Coventry, England

Coordinates: 52.385970°N 1.466785°W

Willenhall
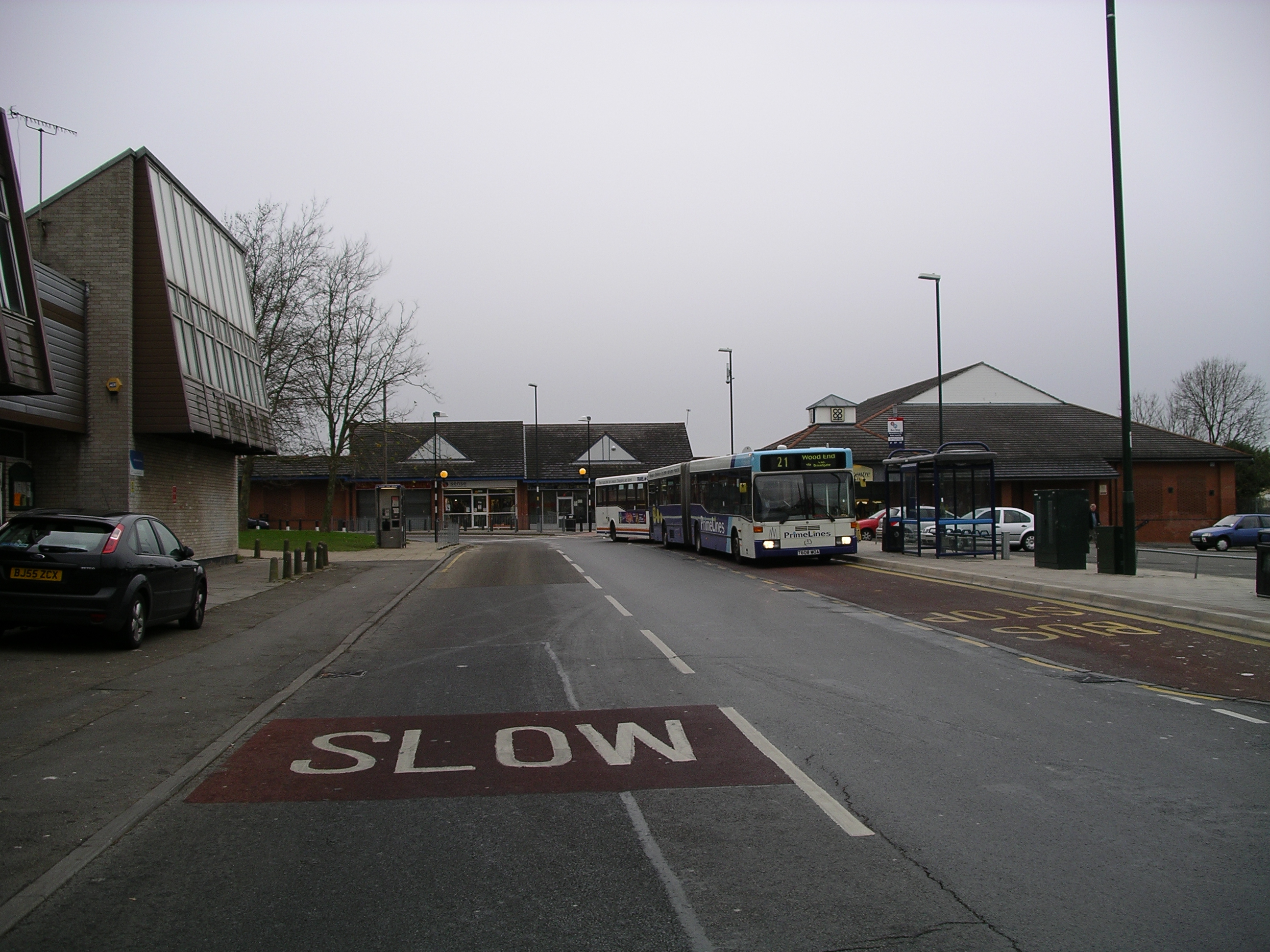
- Shops on Remembrance Road, Willenhall

- Location within the West Midlands
- Metropolitan borough: Coventry
- Metropolitan county: West Midlands
- Region: West Midlands
- Country: England
- Sovereign state: United Kingdom
- Police: West Midlands
- Fire: West Midlands
- Ambulance: West Midlands

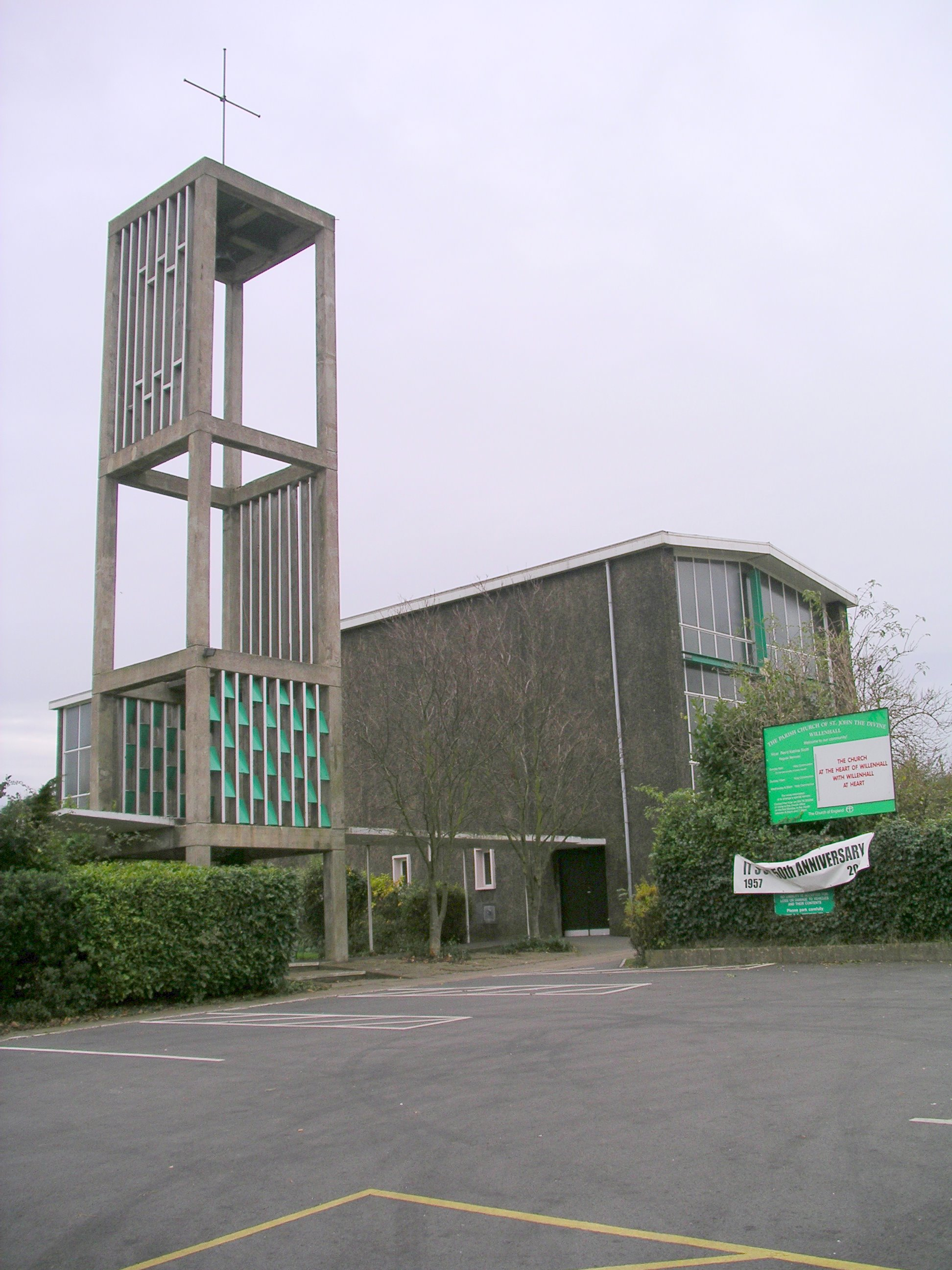
The parish church of St John the Divine

Willenhall is a suburb of Coventry, in the county of the West Midlands, England.

Willenhall is in the south-east of the city adjacent to the suburbs of Binley, Ernesford Grange and Whitley. It covers the area bounded by the Rugby to Coventry railway line, the River Sowe and the city's boundary with Warwickshire. The district is contiguous with the smaller Stonehouse estate to the southwest, Toll Bar End to the south and Willenhall Wood, which adjoins to the northeast.

For general election purposes it is part of the Coventry South Constituency and for local elections it forms part of the Binley and Willenhall ward on Coventry City Council. The population of this ward at the 2011 census was 16,991.

== History ==
Willenhall was originally a small village that was absorbed into the city as it expanded.

Willenhall was formerly in the parish of Coventry-Holy Trinity, in 1866 Willenhall became a separate civil parish, on 1 April 1932 the parish was abolished and merged with Coventry and Baginton. In 1931 the parish had a population of 348.

During the Second World War the Chace National Service Hostel was built in the area to accommodate the influx of munitions workers to the City. After the war the estate became established with the building of a large number of council houses. The area today remains mainly residential though to the south-east there is 9 hectares of woodland called Willenhall Wood which has been designated a nature reserve.

Willenhall is the location of the Chace Avenue police station that forms part of the Coventry Local Policing Team of the West Midlands Police and houses the Binley and Willenhall neighbourhood team.

== Education ==
Willenhall has three primary schools:

- St. Anne's Catholic Primary School
- Stretton Church of England Academy
- Willenhall Community

For Secondary education the pupils of the above primary schools normally advance to:

- Bishop Ullathorne RC School
- Ernesford Grange School & Community College
- Whitley Abbey Community School

== Religion ==
The Church of England parish church for Willenhall is St John the Divine, which was designed by Basil Spence and consecrated in 1957. Spence used this as a trial for his later Coventry Cathedral.

The area is also served by St Anne’s Roman Catholic Church and Willenhall Free Church which is affiliated with the FIEC.

== Rioting ==
In May 1992, rioting that began in the Wood End and Hillfields areas of the city spread into Willenhall.

== Air crash ==
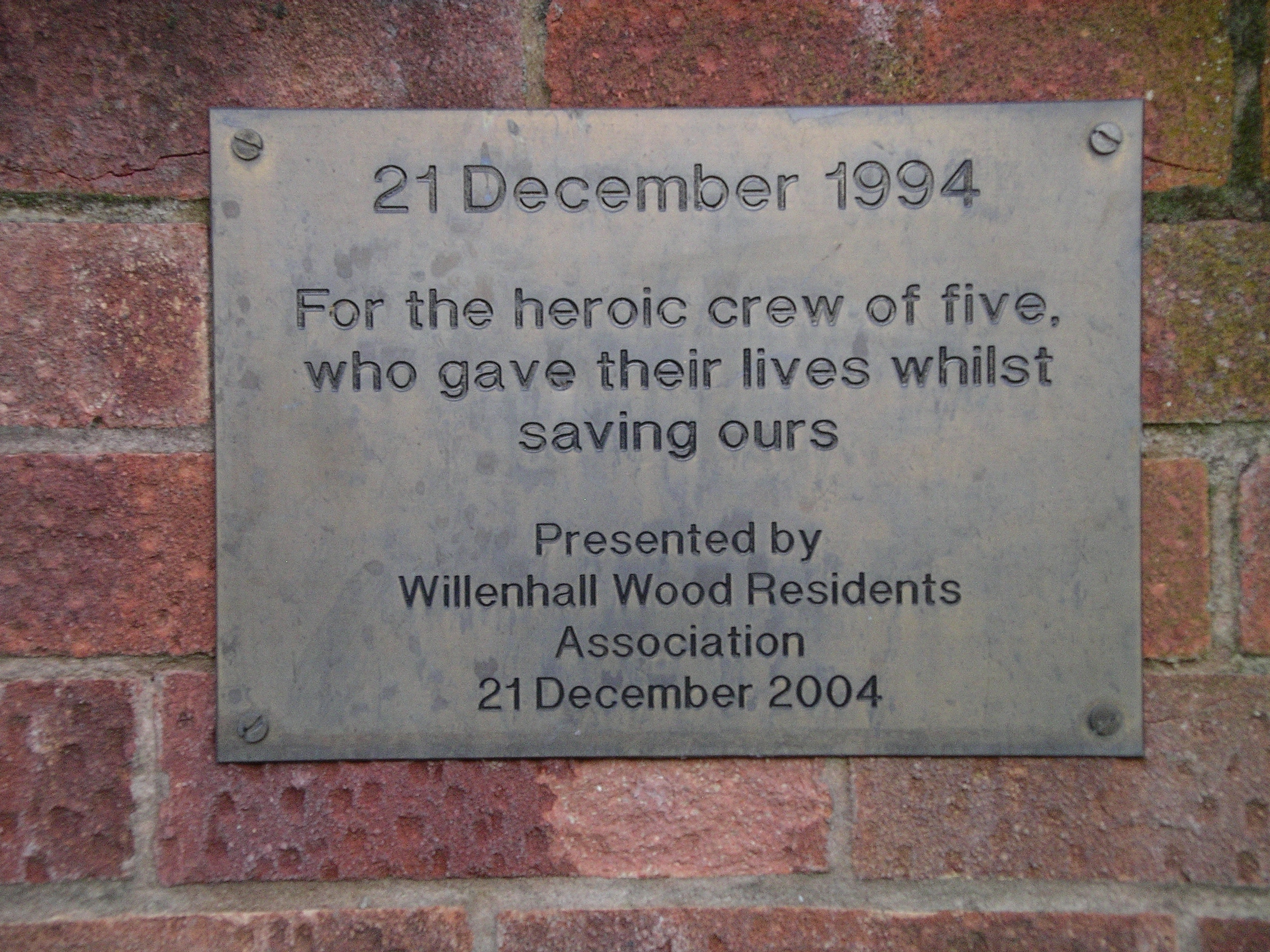
Plaque on Middle Ride

Willenhall was the site of a major air crash when at 9:52 a.m. on 21 December 1994 an aircraft approaching Coventry Airport, in poor visibility, crashed into Willenhall Wood, killing all five crew on board. The aircraft was a Boeing 737 that was owned and operated by Air Algerie but leased by Phoenix Aviation to undertake a number of live veal calf export flights from the airport.

A brass plaque remembering the event is now located in Middle Ride, close to the crash scene, which was erected on the crash’s 10th anniversary by the Willenhall Wood Residents Association.

== Gallery ==
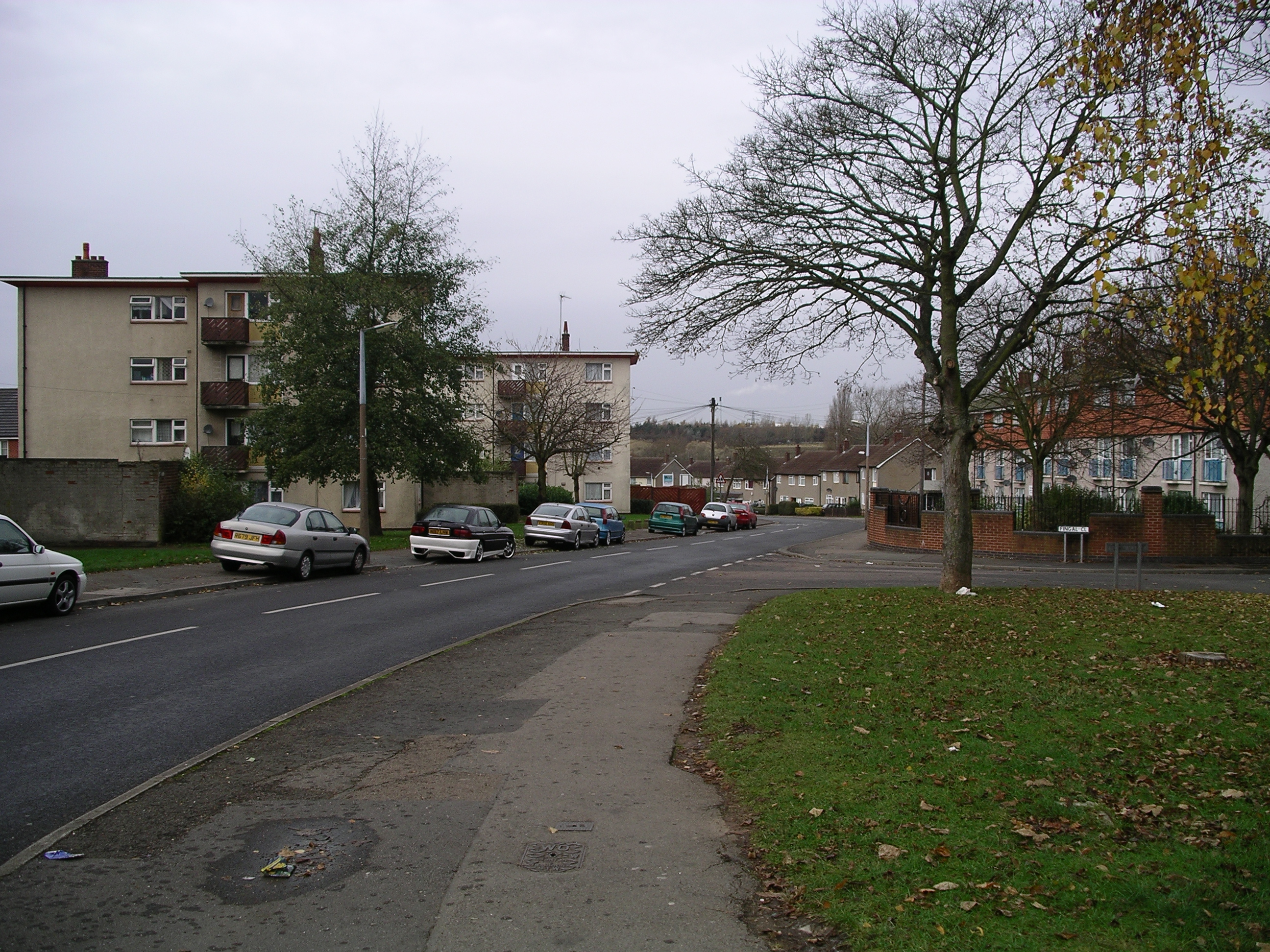
Robin Hood Road, Willenhall

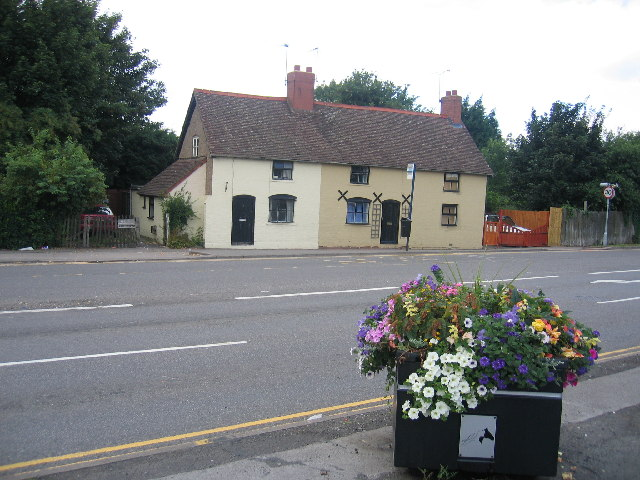
Cottages in St James Lane, Willenhall
