= Toll Bar End =

Area of Coventry, West Midlands, England

Coordinates: 52.379°N 1.467°W

Toll Bar End is a suburb of Coventry, England, that lies on the southeasternmost fringe of the city. It is contiguous with the city's Willenhall and Stonehouse residential areas, close to the northern end of Coventry Airport's runway and midway between the city's Whitley district and the Warwickshire village of Ryton-on-Dunsmore.

The focal point of the area is the Toll Bar Island, a major road intersection where the A45, A46 and B4110 (London Road) converge. It is a main transport route out of the city and provides access to Coventry Airport, Middlemarch Business Park and the Airport Retail Park. Another area of interest is Gary C King museum, that specialises in the Coventry motor industry; the demolished Peugeot Ryton plant lies close by along the A45.
