= This Summer Feeling =

- Film poster
- Ce sentiment de l'été
- Directed by: Mikhaël Hers
- Written by: Mikhaël Hers; Mariette Désert
- Produced by: Pierre Guyard
- Starring: Anders Danielsen Lie; Judith Chemla
- Cinematography: Sébastien Buchmann
- Edited by: Marion Monnier
- Music by: David Sztanke
- Production companies: Nord-Ouest Films; Arte France Cinéma; Katuh Studio; Rhône-Alpes Cinéma
- Distributed by: Pyramide Distribution (France); Rendezvous Filmverleih (Germany)
- Release dates: 11 October 2015 (FIFIB); 17 February 2016 (France); 3 November 2016 (Germany)
- Running time: 106 minutes
- Countries: France; Germany
- Languages: French; English; German
- Budget: €2.9 million

This Summer Feeling (French: Ce sentiment de l'été) is a 2015 French-German drama film directed by Mikhaël Hers and starring Anders Danielsen Lie and Judith Chemla.

== Cast ==
- Anders Danielsen Lie as Lawrence
- Judith Chemla as Zoé
- Marie Rivière as Adélaïde
- Féodor Atkine as Vladimir
- Dounia Sichov as Ida
- Stéphanie Déhel as Sasha
- Lana Cooper as June
- Thibault Vinçon as David
- Laure Calamy as Anouk
- Timothé Vom Dorp as Nils
- Jean-Pierre Kalfon as Faris
- Marin Ireland as Nina
- Josh Safdie as Thomas
- Mac DeMarco as Marc
- Trey Gerrald as Harvey
