= Air Algérie Flight 702P =

1994 air crash in England

Phoenix Aviation Flight 702P
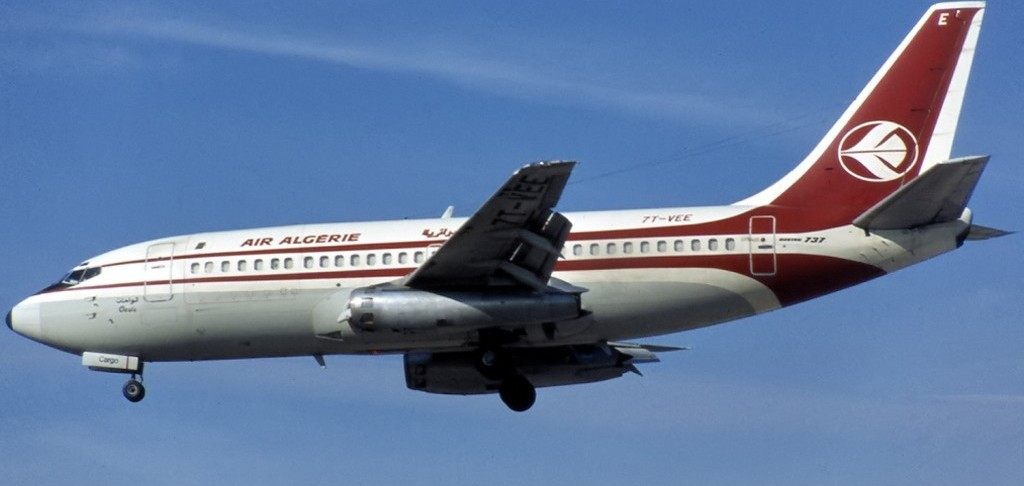
- 7T-VEE, the aircraft involved in the accident in a previous livery in 1979

Accident
- Date: 21 December 1994
- Summary: Controlled flight into terrain due to pilot error
- Site: Willenhall, near Coventry Airport, Coventry-Baginton, England, United Kingdom; 52.38443°N 1.45289°W

Aircraft
- Aircraft type: Boeing 737-2D6C
- Aircraft name: Oasis
- Operator: Air Algérie, leased from Phoenix Aviation
- Call sign: ACE CARGO 702P
- Registration: 7T-VEE
- Flight origin: Amsterdam Airport Schiphol, Amsterdam, Netherlands
- Stopover: East Midlands Airport, East Midlands, England, United Kingdom (unplanned)
- Destination: Coventry Airport, Coventry-Baginton, England
- Occupants: 5
- Passengers: 2
- Crew: 3
- Fatalities: 5
- Survivors: 0

Air Algérie Flight 702P was a domestic flight operated by a Boeing 737-200 owned by Air Algérie under lease to Phoenix Aviation. On 21 December 1994, in low visibility conditions, it collided with power transmission cables and a pylon during its final approach to Coventry Airport in the United Kingdom. The aircraft subsequently overturned and damaged several houses before crashing inverted into a wooded area beyond. All five people on board were killed.

== Accident ==
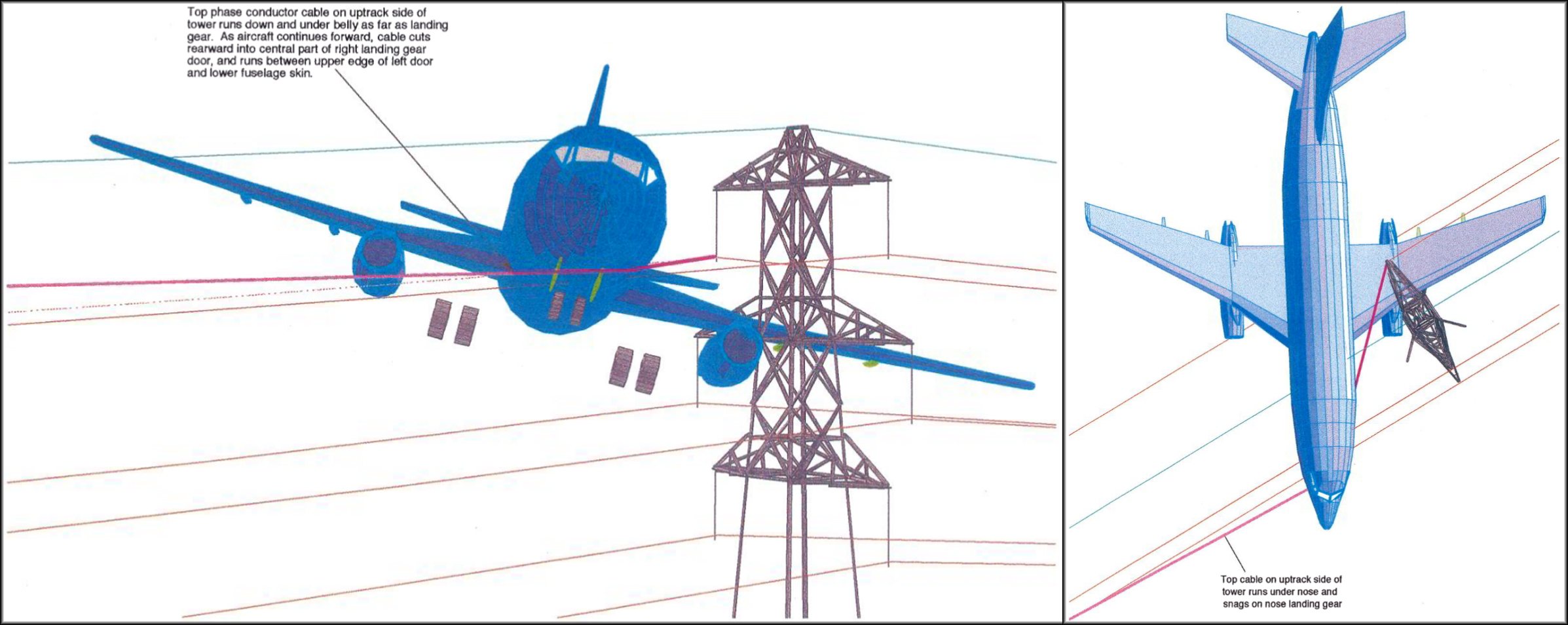
Aircraft position at moment of impact with pylon and cables. Frontal (left) and overhead (right) views.

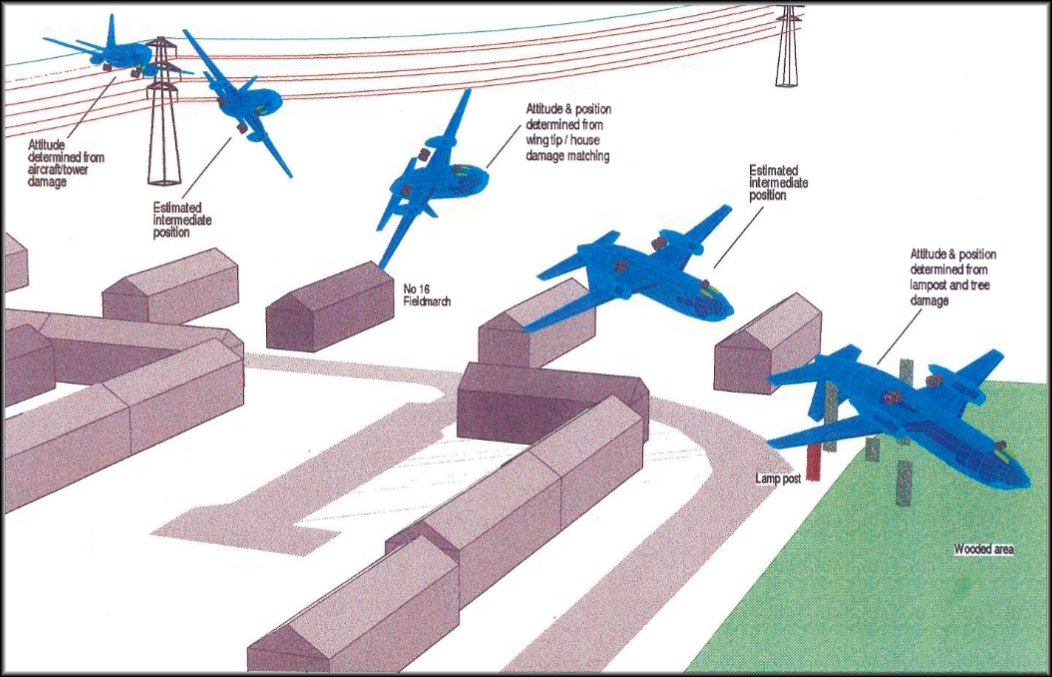
Flight path of 7T-VEE between impact with cables and pylon and the ground.

The occupants consisted of three Algerian crew members and two English stock handlers.

The captain of flight 702P was 44-year-old Ahmed Nemdil who had accumulated 10,686 flight hours with 2,187 on the Boeing 737-200. The first officer, 35-year-old Nasreddine Hantour, had 2,858 hours of flying time with most of them on the B737-200. They were accompanied by an Air Algérie maintenance engineer, 38-year-old el-Hachemi Abdellaoui; and the stock handlers were 31-year-old Adrian Sharp and 22-year-old Andrew Yates. Both were employed by Phoenix Aviation.

On the day of the accident, the aircraft and crew departed Amsterdam for their second flight to Coventry that morning (their first having arrived at 0340 hrs), where live animals were to be loaded on board for export to the Netherlands and France. Visibility at Coventry was poor due to fog and a low cloud layer, and it deteriorated steadily during the early morning hours; by the time the aircraft reached the Coventry area, the runway visual range (RVR) for the main runway at Coventry Airport was 700 metres (2,300 ft), which was below their regulatory minimum of 1,200 metres (3,900 ft) for conducting the approach at that time. The aircraft was not equipped to receive the newer Instrument landing system signal for the runway in use, so the pilots used a surveillance radar approach (SRA) procedure, which depended on guidance from an air traffic control radar operator. The aircrew was experienced with SRA approach procedures at Coventry, having conducted an SRA approach earlier that day to the same runway, "showing close adherence to the ideal approach path." Visibility was too poor to make a safe landing on this second approach, so the captain performed a missed approach procedure and diverted to the East Midlands Airport. Approximately 90 minutes after landing at East Midlands, visibility at Coventry improved significantly, though with an RVR of 1,100 metres (3,600 ft), it still was not adequate to meet their required minimum, which had increased to 1,500 metres (4,900 ft) due to the controllers at Coventry not having adequate notice to set up their specialized SRA radar in time for 7T-VEE's arrival. The flight departed East Midlands at 9:38 local time in order to make another attempt to land at the scheduled destination. At this point the pilots had been on duty for ten hours total (two hours more than their company's normal maximum for overnight operations), including five flight segments since 2345 hrs the previous night, two of which had included SRA approaches to runway 23 at Coventry (one concluding with a successful landing at 0340 hrs and the second concluding with a missed approach and diversion to East Midlands at 0740 hrs, and both being described as accurate and correctly stabilised by AAIB investigators). The accident flight lasted fourteen minutes, which left the crew with insufficient time to perform all normal flight deck procedures. During their third and final SRA approach to runway 23 at Coventry, their approach was never stabilised, and they developed an excess of airspeed. The landing checklist was not completed, and there was minimal communication between the captain and the first officer. The latter did not call out the minimum descent altitude (MDA), which is normal company procedure. The aircraft descended well below the MDA and collided with an 86-foot-high (26 m) electricity transmission tower situated on the extended centreline of the runway approximately 1.1 miles (0.96 nmi; 1.8 km) from the runway threshold. The collision severed the upper portion of the tower and caused severe damage to the left engine and to the structure of the left wing; the aircraft rolled to the left and dropped, damaging several houses in Sunbury before crashing into Willenhall, Coventry woodland and catching fire.

== Aftermath ==
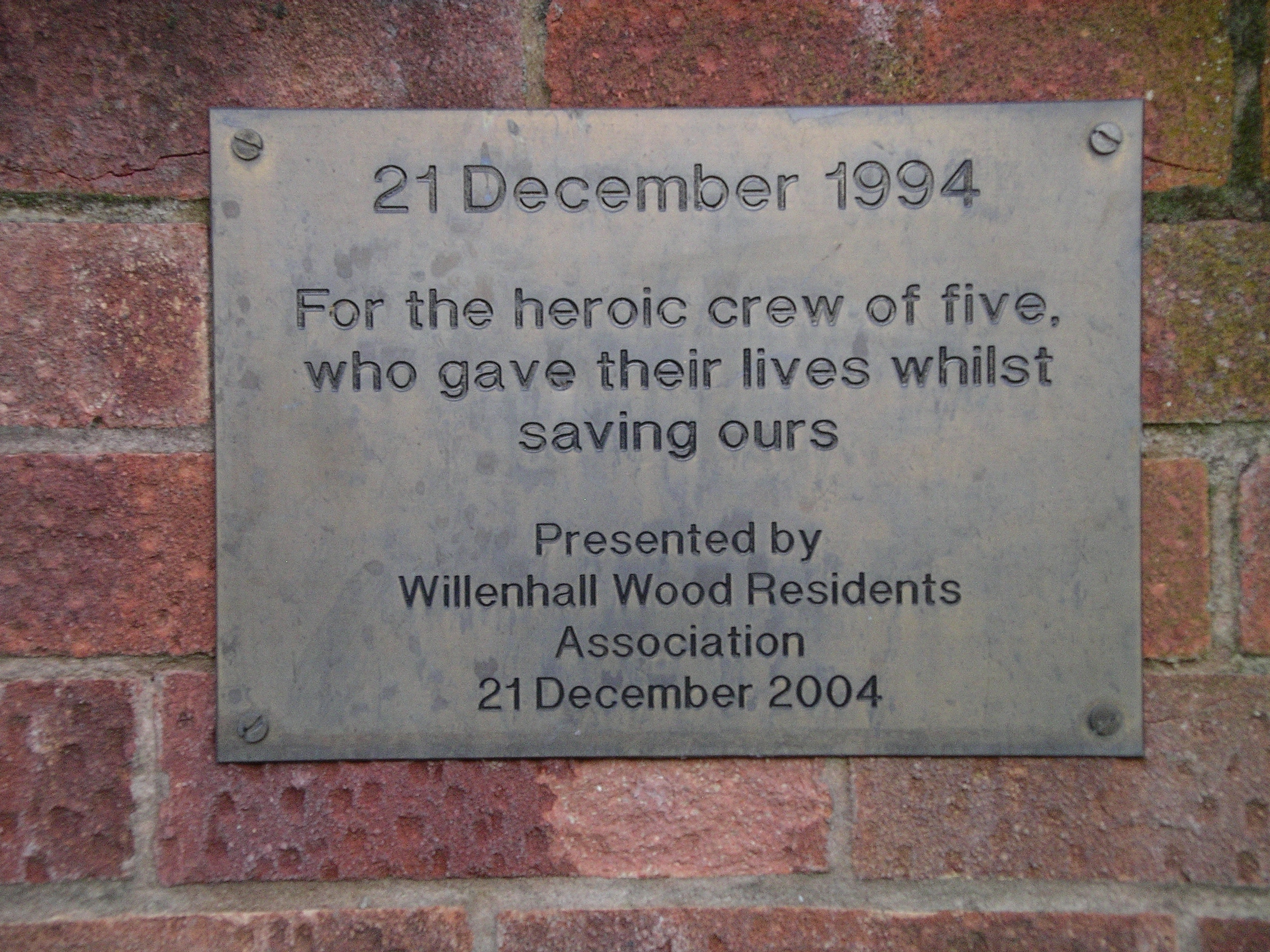
Plaque on Middle Ride

The Air Accidents Investigation Branch (AAIB) determined that the accident was caused by the flight crew allowing the aircraft to descend significantly below the minimum descent height for the approach without gaining sight of the approach lighting or runway threshold. The AAIB also found that the crew had failed to cross-check altimeter height indications during the approach, that the non-handling pilot failed to call out the minimum descent height as the aircraft reached that altitude, and that the flight crew's performance had been impaired by the effects of fatigue.

A brass plaque remembering the event is now located in Middle Ride, close to the crash scene, which was erected on the 10th anniversary of the accident by the Willenhall Wood Residents Association.

== See also ==
- List of accidents and incidents involving commercial aircraft

== Bibliography ==
Air Accidents Investigation Branch

- "Report on the accident to Boeing 737-2D6C, 7T-VEE at Willenhall, Coventry, Warwickshire on 21 December 1994." (Archive)
  - Appendices to the report (Archive)
- "SUMMARY AAR 1/1996: Boeing 737, 7T-VEE." (Archive)
