= Highfield Road =

Former football stadium in Coventry, England

- Highfield Road
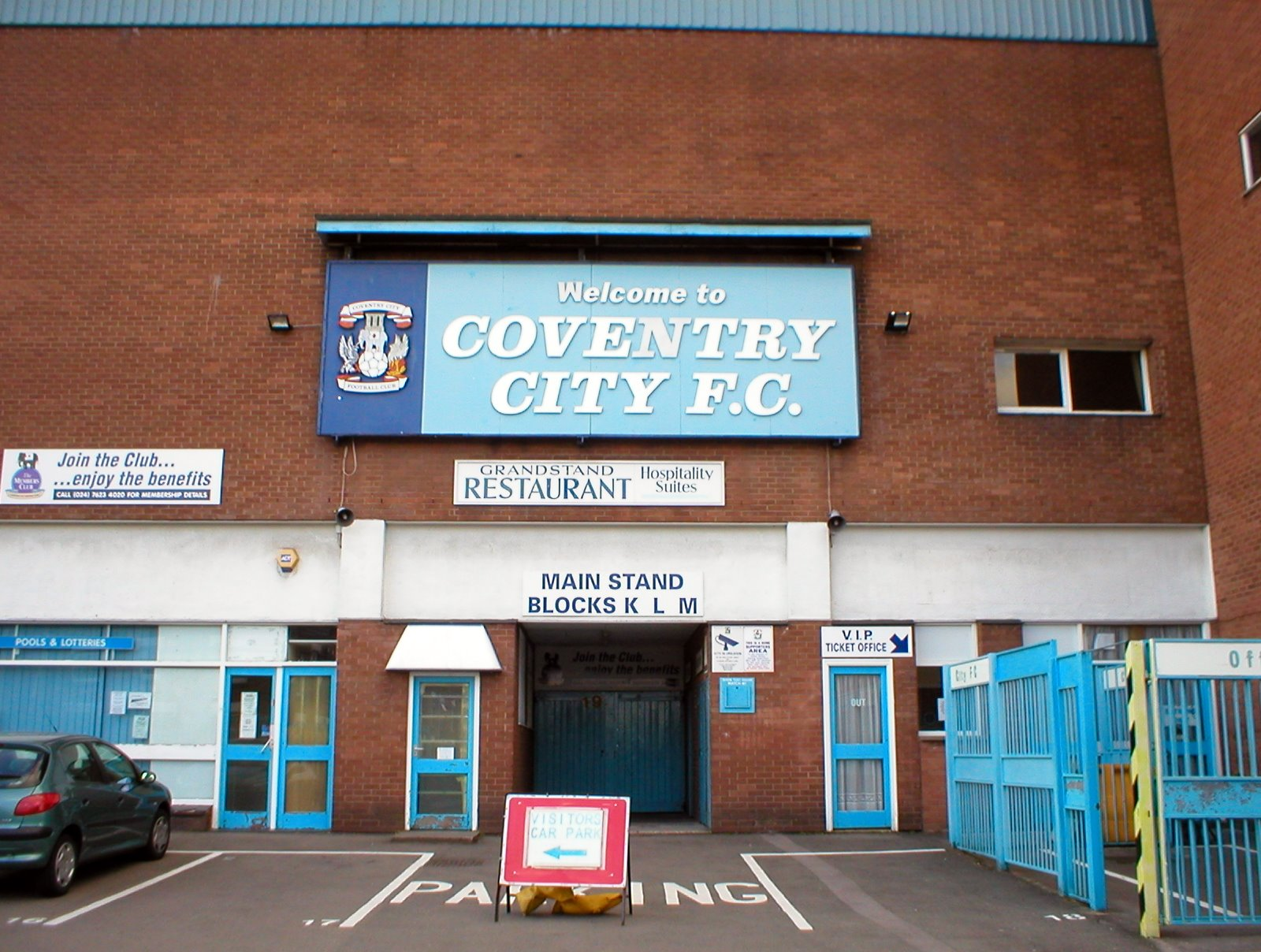
- Entrance, 22 April 2004
- Interactive map of Highfield Road
- Location: Hillfields, Coventry, England
- Coordinates: 52°24′43″N 1°29′24″W
- Owner: Coventry City
- Capacity: 23,489 (as all-seater)
- Surface: Grass

Construction
- Opened: 1899
- Closed: 30 April 2005 (last game)
- Demolished: 2006

Tenant
- Coventry City (1899–2005)

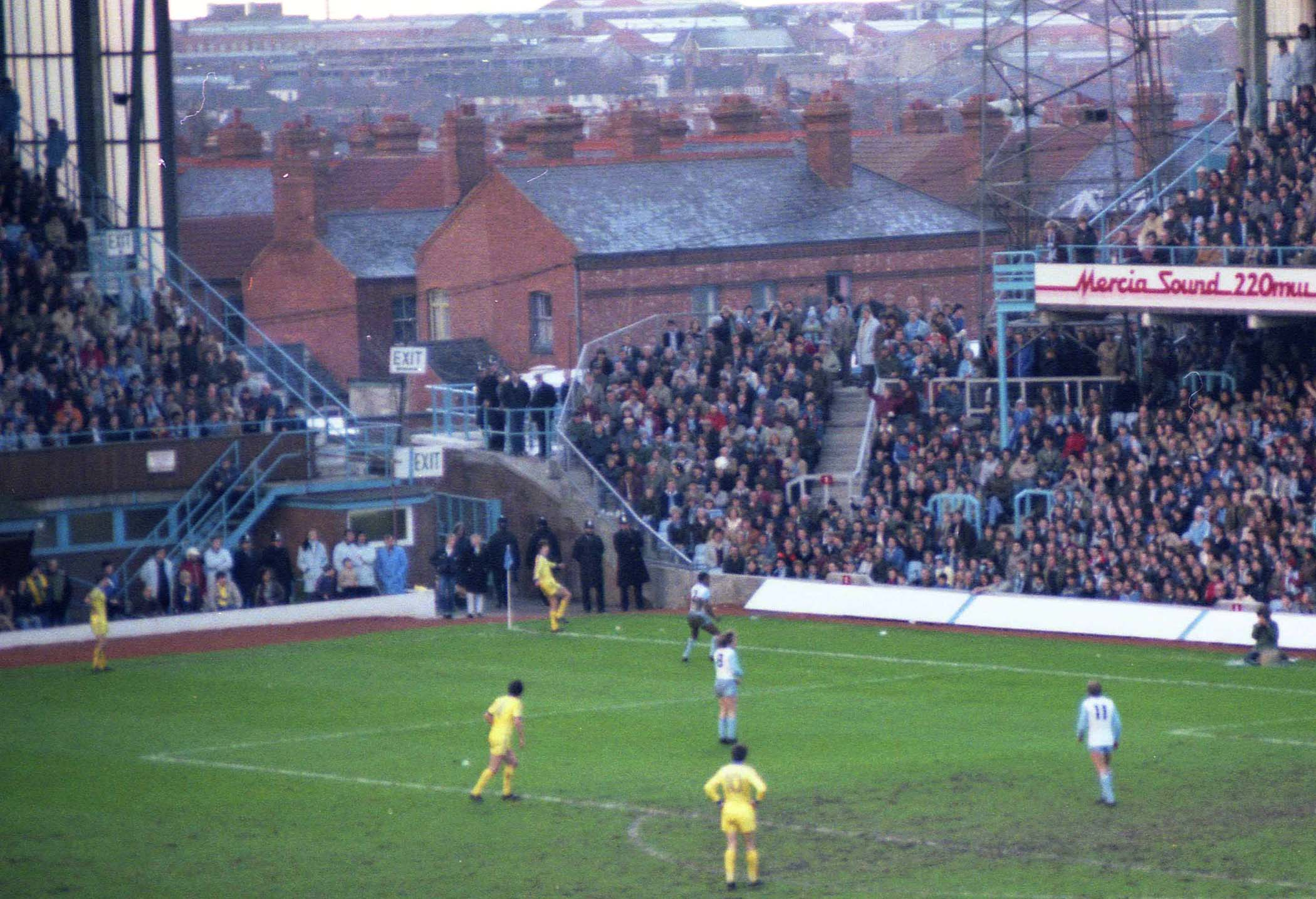
Highfield Road in 1982

Highfield Road was a football stadium in the city of Coventry, England. It was the home ground for Coventry City for 106 years.

== History ==
It was built in 1899 in the Hillfields district, close to the city centre, and staged its final game on 30 April 2005 when Coventry City beat Derby County 6–2 in the Football League Championship with the last goal appropriately being scored by Andy Whing, a product of Coventry City's youth academy. A concert by pop star Elton John was held at the stadium afterwards. The club then moved to the Ricoh Arena, at Foleshill in the north of the city.

Highfield Road had one of the largest playing surfaces in the English leagues and was the English league's first all-seater stadium (the first all-seater in the UK was Clydebank's Kilbowie Park). The all-seater policy introduced by Jimmy Hill was later abandoned when Leeds United fans tore-out several hundred seats after losing their First Division game to Coventry City 4–0 in 1981, only months after the seats had been installed.

Standing accommodation returned to Highfield Road in 1983, but it became all-seater once again eleven years later when all top division clubs were required to have all-seater stadiums as a result of the Taylor Report, which was the response to the Hillsborough disaster of 1989.

The stadium's record attendance was 51,455 when Coventry City played their West Midlands rivals Wolverhampton Wanderers in a Football League Division 2 game in 1967. However, after it was converted to an all-seater stadium for the second time in the mid-1990s, its maximum capacity was 23,489 at the time of its closure, and all of the pre-1990 seats had been replaced in 1995. The stadium had by then been well-developed with one corner filled to provide a more modern look and feel.

However, it lacked facilities compared to the new stadia of similar-sized clubs, which was one of the main causes of the move to the Ricoh Arena. Another reason for relocation was that parking facilities in the local area were inadequate. When the stadium was first given the go-ahead in 1999, it had been planned to build a 45,000-seat stadium as part of England's bid to host the 2006 World Cup. However, England's failure to win the bid to host the tournament – combined with Coventry's relegation in 2001 – saw the stadium's capacity scaled down.

Demolition work began in February 2006 and was completed by the end of the following month.

== Post-stadium housing development ==
The site of the stadium was regenerated by George Wimpey plc to provide housing on the areas which were originally the car parks and stands. The area which was the playing surface was relaid with grass so that the local children can continue the tradition of playing football on that space.

Redevelopment

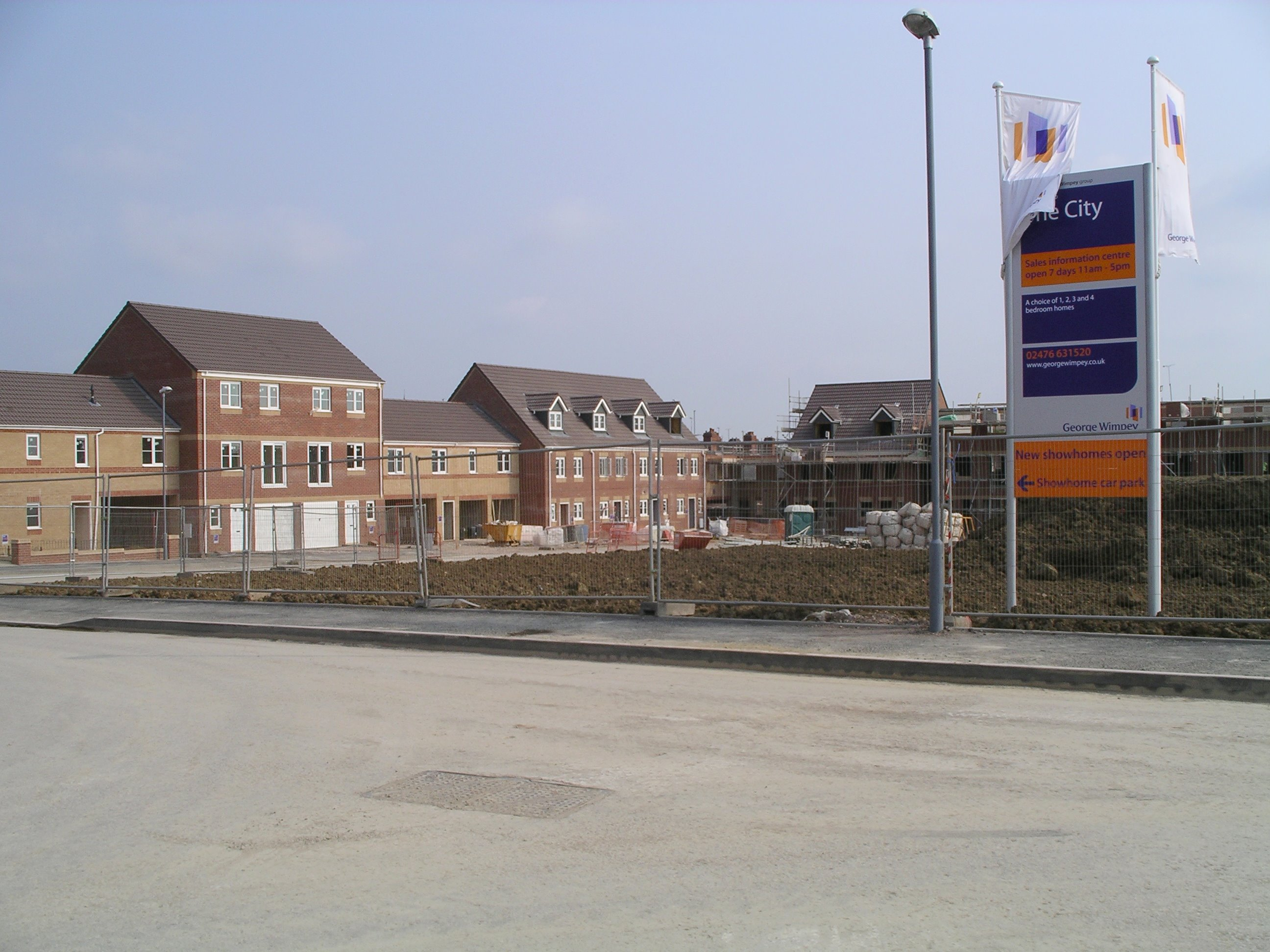
New buildings around the site of the former football pitch.
(photo April 2007)

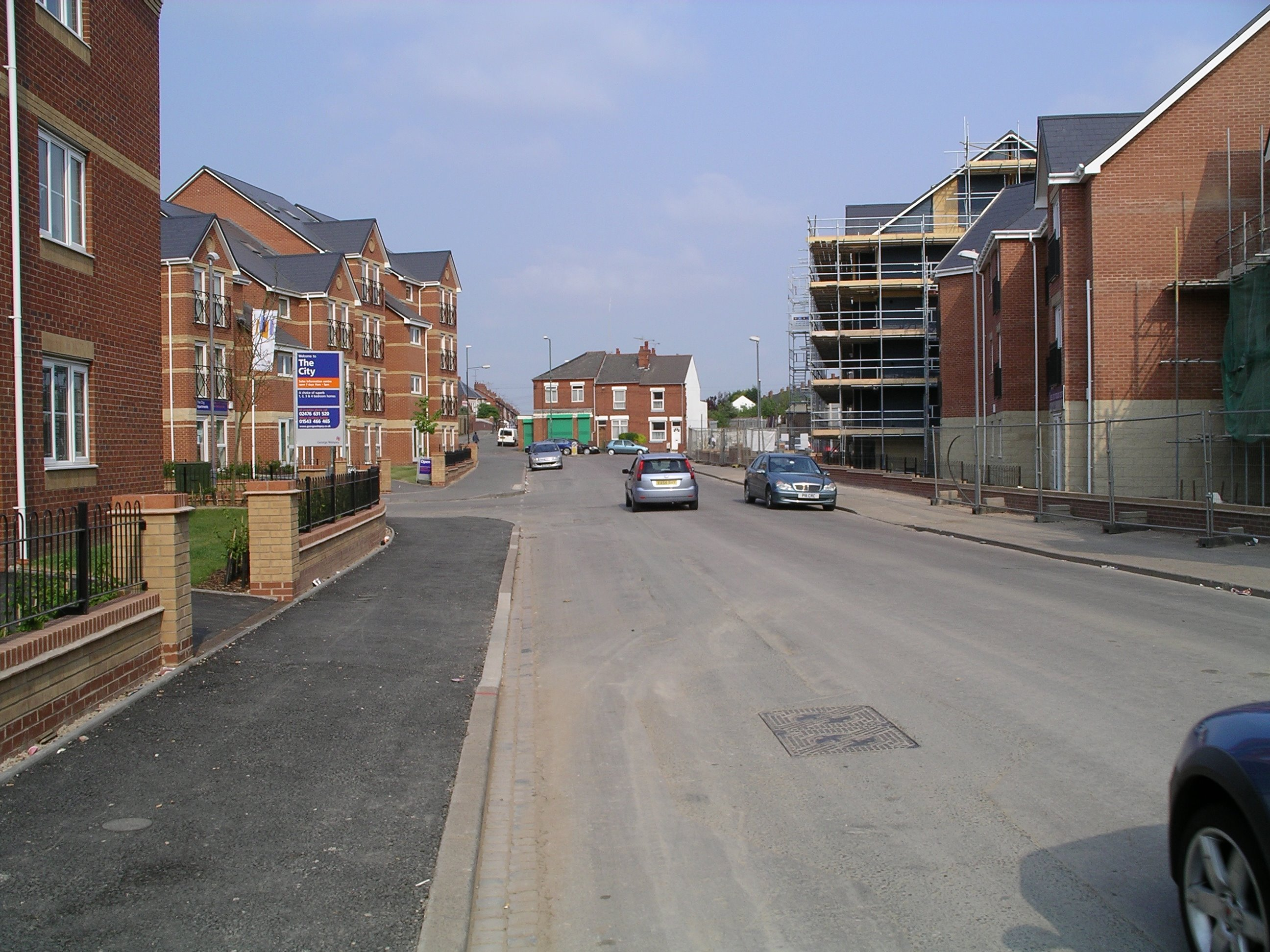
View eastward along Thackhall Street in April 2007; the stadium was on the right and a car park was on the left.
