= Amanda (2018 film) =

- Directed by: Mikhaël Hers
- Written by: Mikhaël Hers; Maud Ameline
- Produced by: Pierre Guyard
- Starring: Vincent Lacoste; Stacy Martin; Isaure Multrier
- Cinematography: Sébastien Buchmann
- Edited by: Marion Monnier
- Music by: Anton Sanko
- Production companies: Nord-Ouest Films; Arte France Cinéma
- Distributed by: Pyramide Distribution
- Release dates: 31 August 2018 (Venice); 21 November 2018 (France)
- Running time: 107 minutes
- Country: France
- Language: French
- Budget: €3.5 million
- Box office: $1.5 million

Amanda is a 2018 French drama film directed by Mikhaël Hers, co-written by Hers and Maud Ameline, and starring Vincent Lacoste, Stacy Martin and Isaure Multrier. It follows David, a young man trying to cope with the emotional distress of losing his sister after a terrorist attack, while also having to care for his now-orphaned young niece (Amanda).

The film had its world premiere in the Horizons section of the 75th Venice International Film Festival on 31 August 2018. It was theatrically released in France on 21 November 2018 by Pyramide Distribution.

== Plot ==
Living in Paris, 24-year-old David is close to his sister Sandrine – a single mother – and her seven-year-old daughter, Amanda. Sandrine is an English teacher, while David looks after holiday lets and is a part-time gardener. He meets Lena, a piano teacher. Sandrine goes to the park with friends where, in a terrorist attack, she is killed and Lena injured. David looks after Amanda but, even with the help of his aunt Maud, he isn’t sure he can cope and considers sending her to a children’s home. Amanda initially wants to stay with Maud but, as she and David begin to bond, she changes her mind. Lena moves back home to Bordeaux but David asks her to move in with him. He then takes Amanda to London to meet his estranged mother Alison, and to visit the Wimbledon Tennis Championships. As their relationship deepens, David decides to become Amanda’s guardian and to adopt her.

== Cast ==
- Vincent Lacoste as David
- Stacy Martin as Léna
- Isaure Multrier as Amanda
- Ophélia Kolb as Sandrine
- Marianne Basler as Maud
- Jonathan Cohen as Axel
- Greta Scacchi as Alison
- Bakary Sangaré as The Children's Home Director
- Nabiha Akkari as Raja
- Raphaël Thiéry as Moïse
- Claire Tran as Lydia
- Elli Medeiros as Eve
- Zoé Bruneau as The Social Worker
- Lily Bensliman as The Journalist At The Café
- Lawrence Valin as The Indian Father
- Missia Piccoli as The Mother At The Lycée
- David Olivier Fischer as The Father At The Lycée
- Luke Tristan as The Man Beside The Thames
- Jeanne Candel as The First Young Woman In The Hospital
- Lisa Wisznia as The Second Young Woman In The Hospital
- Léah Lapiower as Emmanuelle
- Carole Rochet as The Guardian At The School
- Christopher Koderisch as A Tennis Player
- Lannart Zynga as A Tennis Player
