= In the House (film) =

2012 French film by François Ozon

- Theatrical release poster
- Directed by: François Ozon
- Screenplay by: François Ozon
- Based on: The Boy in the Last Row by Juan Mayorga
- Produced by: Éric Altmayer; Nicolas Altmeyer; Claudie Ossard
- Starring: Fabrice Luchini; Kristin Scott Thomas; Emmanuelle Seigner; Denis Ménochet; Ernst Umhauer
- Cinematography: Jérôme Alméras
- Edited by: Laure Gardette
- Music by: Philippe Rombi
- Production companies: La Banque Postale Images 5; Canal+; France 2 Cinéma; Mandarin Cinéma; Palatine Étoile 9; Région Ile-de-France
- Distributed by: Mars Distribution
- Release dates: 10 September 2012 (TIFF); 3 October 2012 (France)
- Running time: 105 minutes
- Country: France
- Language: French
- Budget: $11 million
- Box office: $16.2 million

In the House (French: Dans la maison) is a 2012 French comedy drama directed by François Ozon. The film's screenplay by Ozon is loosely based on Juan Mayorga's play El chico de la última fila (The Boy in the Last Row).

The film won the main prize at the 2012 San Sebastián International Film Festival, the Golden Shell, as well as the Jury Prize for Best Screenplay.

== Plot ==
Germain, a middle-aged literature teacher, bonds with his 16-year-old student, Claude Garcia, while tutoring him to improve his writing skills. This leads the precocious and disdainful student to be increasingly transgressive and antisocial, demonstrating a flair for manipulating relationship dynamics and for finding ways to satisfy his needs. The student seduces his friend's mother and the teacher's wife. He inadvertently causes the teacher to be dismissed but they remain in touch due to their mutual passion in finding stories that excite them.

== Cast ==
- Fabrice Luchini as Germain Germain
- Kristin Scott Thomas as Jeanne Germain
- Ernst Umhauer as Claude Garcia
- Emmanuelle Seigner as Esther Artole
- Denis Ménochet as Raphael 'Rapha' Artole (Senior)
- Bastien Ughetto as Raphael 'Rapha' Artole (Junior)
- Yolande Moreau as Rosalie / Eugénie
- Jean-François Balmer as The principal

== Production ==
François Ozon adapted the screenplay from Spanish writer Juan Mayorga's play The Boy in the Last Row. The film was produced through Mandarin Cinéma for a budget of 9.2 million euro. It received support from France 2 Cinéma and Mars Films. Filming took place during eight weeks in August and September 2011.

== Release ==
The film opened in France on 3 October 2012 through Mars Distribution.

=== Box office ===
In the House earned $9,529,425 in France and $17,860,068 altogether overseas while grossing $389,757 in the United States for a worldwide total of $18,249,825.

=== Critical reception ===
On the review aggregator website Rotten Tomatoes, 88% of 82 critics' reviews are positive. The website's consensus reads: "Dark, tense, and wryly funny, In the House is brilliantly directed by François Ozon and features fine performances from its talented cast." Metacritic, which uses a weighted average, assigned the film a score of 72 out of 100, based on 25 critics, indicating "generally favorable" reviews.
