= Ernst Umhauer =

French actor

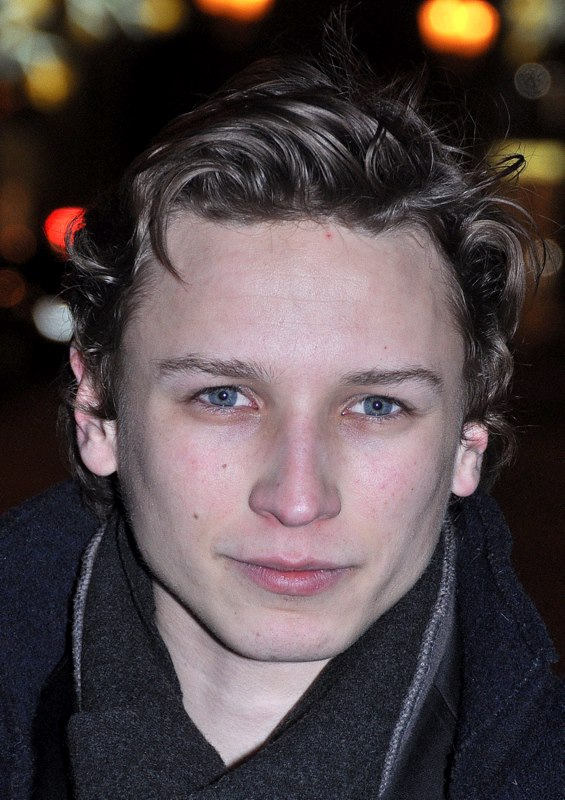
- Umhauer in 2013
- Born: 2 December 1989 (age 36); Cherbourg, Manche, France
- Occupation: Actor
- Years active: 2009–present

Ernst Umhauer (born 2 December 1989) is a French actor who is best known for his role as Claude Garcia in the 2012 film In The House, directed by François Ozon.

== Early life and education ==
Umhauer was born in Cherbourg, France, and was named after the painter Max Ernst. His father was a photographer.

He studied drama for three years at the "Maison des Jeunes et de la Culture” of Cherbourg and started to act in several short movies in 2009, before obtaining his first role in the film Le Cri, directed by Raphaël Mathié.

== Career ==
In 2011, he appeared alongside Vincent Cassel in the film The Monk directed by Dominik Moll, in which he played a young novice.

In 2012, the French director François Ozon asked him to play the clever and puzzling young Claude Garcia in the film In The House, alongside Fabrice Luchini, Emmanuelle Seigner and Kristin Scott Thomas. His performance won him the 2013 Lumière Award for Most Promising Actor, and a nomination in the same category during the 38th Césars Award Ceremony, an award which was won by Matthias Schoenaerts.

== Filmography ==
- Le Cri (2009)
- The Monk (2011): The novice
- In The House (2012): Claude Garcia
- Sire Gauvain et le Chevalier Vert (2014): Sire Gauvain
- The Returned (2012-2015): Virgil
- Un monde ailleurs (2020): William
- Scarlet (2022)

== Awards and nominations ==
- Lumière Award for Most Promising Actor (2013)
- Nomination for the César Award for Most Promising Actor (2013)
