= Scarlet (2022 film) =

- Directed by: Pietro Marcello
- Written by: Pietro Marcello; Maurizio Braucci; Maud Ameline; Geneviève Brisac
- Produced by: Charles Gillibert
- Starring: Raphaël Thiéry; Juliette Jouan; Louis Garrel; Noémie Lvovsky; Ernst Umhauer; François Négret; Yolande Moreau
- Cinematography: Marco Graziaplena
- Music by: Gabriel Yared
- Production companies: CG Cinema; Avventurosa; Rai Cinema; Wise Pictures; Hype Film; The Match Factory; Arte
- Distributed by: Le Pacte
- Release date: 18 May 2022 (Cannes)
- Running time: 100 minutes
- Countries: France; Italy; Germany; Russia
- Language: French
- Box office: $450,213

Scarlet (French: L'Envol, lit. 'Flight') is a 2022 drama film, directed by Pietro Marcello, from a screenplay by Marcello, Maurizio Braucci, Maud Amelin, and Geneviève Brisac. It is loosely based on Scarlet Sails, a 1923 novel by Alexander Grin. It stars Raphaël Thiéry, Juliette Jouan, Louis Garrel, Noémie Lvovsky, Ernst Umhauer, François Négret and Yolande Moreau. It was a French-led production with co-production companies in Italy, Germany and Russia.

It had its world premiere at the 2022 Cannes Film Festival on 18 May 2022, in the Directors Fortnight section.

== Cast ==
- Raphaël Thiéry as Raphaël
- Juliette Jouan as Juliette
- Louis Garrel as Jean
- Noémie Lvovsky as Adeline
- Ernst Umhauer as Renaud
- François Négret as Fernand
- Yolande Moreau as The magician
- Lolita Chammah as the wife of Renaud

== Production ==
In April 2021, it was announced Juliette Jouan, Raphaël Thiéry, Louis Garrel, and Noémie Lvovsky had joined the cast of the film, with Pietro Marcello directing from a screenplay he wrote, with Arte set to produce. In August 2021, Ernst Umhauer, François Négret and Yolande Moreau joined the cast of the film.

Principal photography began in August 2021.

== Release ==
It had its world premiere at the 2022 Cannes Film Festival on 18 May 2022, in the Directors Fortnight section. The film was invited in Gala Presentation section of 27th Busan International Film Festival to be screened in October 2022.

== Reception ==
=== Critical reception ===
On the review aggregator website Rotten Tomatoes, 79% of 10 critics' reviews are positive, with an average rating of 7/10. The website's consensus reads: "Its many disparate ingredients come together in a somewhat lumpy blend, but Scarlet remains a largely bewitching period fantasy." Metacritic, which uses a weighted average, assigned the film a score of 74 out of 100, based on ten critics, indicating "generally favorable" reviews.
