= Sidney Stringer Academy =

Secondary school in Coventry, England

Location
- 2 Primrose Hill Street; Coventry, West Midlands, CV1 5LY; England; 52.4119°N 1.5031°W

Information
- Type: Academy
- Established: 1972, (New Building Est in 2012)
- Local authority: Coventry City Council
- Trust: Sidney Stringer Multi Academy Trust
- Specialist: Mathematics and Computing College
- Department for Education URN: 136126 Tables
- Ofsted: Reports
- Associate Headteacher: Anna Ford
- Headteacher / MAT CEO: Claire Turpin
- Gender: Coeducational
- Age: 11 to 18
- Enrolment: 1,320 (approx.)
- Houses: Jaguar, Swanswell, Lanchester, Da Vinci and Phoenix
- Colours: Green (Jaguar), Purple (Swanswell), Blue (Lanchester), Orange (Da Vinci) and Red (Phoenix).
- Website: www.sidneystringeracademy.org.uk
Sidney Stringer Multi Academy Trust
- Founded: 14 August 2008
- Type: Multi-academy trust
- Registration no.: 06672920
- Location: 2 Primrose Hill Street, Coventry CV1 5LY.
- Website: www.sidneystringertrust.org.uk

Sidney Stringer Academy is a coeducational (mixed) academy school for pupils aged 11–18 in Hillfields, Coventry, England. It was Sidney Stringer School and Community College from 1972 until 1994, then Sidney Stringer Community Technology College until c. 2004 and Sidney Stringer School to 2010 when it became Sidney Stringer Academy.

== History ==
Sidney Stringer first opened as a School and Community College in 1972 as the first urban community school in England.

The school was formed from the merger of two secondary modern schools – Frederick Bird on Swan Lane (subsequently became a primary school) and Broad Heath on Broad Street. It was one of the first Community Colleges in the 1970s and one of the first Technology Colleges in the 1990s.

The school was named after Alderman Sidney Stringer, a former mayor of Coventry who dedicated himself to the rebuilding of the city after the devastation of the Second World War. The community college is in the Swanswell area close to the city centre, a 5-minute walk from the central bus station.

In 2006, controversial plans to merge Sidney Stringer School with Barr's Hill School to form a city academy were dropped.

=== Fire ===
On 25 September 2007, a fire destroyed 40% of the old 1972 school buildings. The school, however, was operating as normal, albeit in temporary classrooms, by February 2008. The school was rebuilt at a cost of £28 million and reopened in 2012 with an official opening ceremony on 4 October 2012 conducted by the Duke of York.

=== Academy ===
Coventry City Council applied for Sidney Stringer to become an Academy, opening in existing buildings in September 2010 and new buildings the following year. The City Council is itself a major sponsor, together with the City (FE) College with Coventry University and Jaguar Cars. It formed part of the city's Swanswell Regeneration Initiative in Hillfields. The formal consultation exercise undertaken in February 2008 revealed the support for the school from the local community, with over 80% of respondents demanding that the name of the school remain the same. The specialisms of the new school would be Mathematics, and Design and Technology.

Amongst changes made on Academy formation was the remodelling of the house system, five houses each with ten vertical tutor groups. There was uniform change from green sweatshirts to black blazers, the introduction of Head boy and girl along with a prefect system (year 10, 11 and 16+ students). The academy also has an academy council for years 7–11. Sidney Stringer Academy had a positive Ofsted on 2013 and has gone on to lead a multi-academy trust, a shared sixth form, a cooperative continual professional development (CPD) centre and Coventry SCITT, the centre that organises in school initial teacher training.

== Academics ==
The curriculum is pupil-centred focusing on their needs. Different pathways ensure pupils can deepen their understanding and enjoyment of topics. On top of traditional GCSEs and A-Levels, pathways can include functional skills, qualifications and work-related learning in conjunction with local colleges and universities. The school uses immersion and cross-curricular integration of topics. At Key Stage 3, topics are carouselled in four-hour blocks, rather than the traditional one-hour blocks. At Key Stage 4, students have six hours a week to immerse themselves in a subject and then sit the examination at the end of the year rather than doing a course on three hours a week over two or three years.

In Key Stage 4, all students study GCSE English Language, GCSE English Literature, GCSE Maths, GCSE Science plus three option subjects over one or three years. In Year 11, there will be an opportunity to study one more option subject, in one year, or catch up. When choosing their option students must study at least one of these five subjects: French, Spanish, History, Geography or Computer Science. To achieve an EBacc pass, they must have level 4 passes in GCSE English (Language or Literature), GCSE Maths, GCSE Science (double or triple award Science or Computer Science), a humanity subject that is GCSE History or Geography, and a language such as GCSE French, Spanish or other GCSE Language. Students take the first one of these exams in Year 9, and do an alternative option in Year 10 and Year 11.

From 2020, students were using the online software Google Classroom, even more so since the COVID-19 pandemic started, and the school is experimenting with Knowledge Organisers.

== Pastoral ==
=== Horizontal tutor groups ===
The house system of the school serves many purposes inside the school, mostly relating to organisation, competitions and rewards. Each house has a name inspired by a certain event, person and/or sponsors. Each of the 5 houses has ten tutor groups; they have 240 students with 48 students in each year. Pupils are assigned a house on admission. Each House is led by a Head of House and overseen by an Assistant Principal. Also, all Houses have House Assistants.

As of 2020, the houses no longer correlate with tutor groups, the new system introduced a year head to replace the old system of houses, due to COVID-19 and the goal to reduce movement in the school.

Before, vertical tutor groups with students from each year were made, and they were meant to make the group more like a family, with the older and younger students giving each other support and advice. In addition to peer-mentoring, it would hypothetically allow students to form a friendship in other year groups and reduce bullying. However, the Head Department decided better results would come out of horizontal tutoring. Instead of 4 people from each year in a 20 people group, there are now 2 groups of 24 people per year, for each year in a house. This system first appears in the August 2020 newsletter of the academy, where before tutor groups were in the format of HXX, where H is the first letter of the house and XX is the two digit number of which tutor group number it was (01-12), the number YHX is used, where Y is the year number (7, 8, 9, 10, 11), H is the house (P, J, L, S, D), and X is the final number (1 or 2).

Each house has its charity week (some have a selected charity), has its colour, and their motto.

Lanchester

The inspiration of the house name is Frederick W. Lanchester and the house encourages the students to be passionate and driven in their studies as Lanchester was. The logo is a blue cog, which references Coventry's industrial age. The logo is inscribed with the letter 'L' in the centre of the cog, which is directly taken from the 'L' in the now dormant Lanchester Motor Company logo, which was a car manufacturer in Coventry from 1899 to 1955. The cog is a reference to how Coventry is famous for its industrial age throughout the 18th and 19th centuries, which further grew specifically into car manufacturing throughout the 20th century, especially after the Coventry Blitz. Their house colour is blue. Their mottos are "Discover the blue in you." and "Driving to success."

Jaguar

The house's name comes from the transport company Jaguar Cars, as does the motto, and logo, although the logo is a green silhouette of the actual Jaguar silver logo. The company is the only prominent luxury vehicle manufacturer in Coventry, and amongst few that exist in the UK. Jaguar sponsored Sidney Stringer Academy for their reconstruction after the 2007 fire. Their house colour is green. Their mottos are "Born to perform, unleash a Jaguar. Don't dream it. Drive it." and "Driven by passion." They have two chosen charities: MS Mercia Therapy Centre in Coventry, and Myton Hospice in Coventry.

Swanswell

The house's name has two major inspirations, the Swanswell Lake which is opposite the road from the school, and the Swanswell Initiative multi-million pound funds that were dedicated to improving a designated 160 acres of Coventry, which Sidney Stringer Academy was inside causing them to receive funds to improve the school on a vast scale. Their logo is symbolic of the swans in the Swanswell Lake. Their house colour is purple. Their motto is "Serenity, Strength, Aspiration, Pride." They also have two chosen charities, Teenage Cancer Trust and Wychbold Swan Rescue.

Da Vinci

The inspiration for the house's name comes from Leonardo da Vinci. The students are encouraged to be creative like da Vinci himself. Their logo depicts a man in two superimposed positions with his arms and legs apart and inscribed in a circle and square, which is a reference to Leonardo Da Vinci's Vitruvian Man symbol. Their house colour is orange. Their motto is "Our future is bright, your future is bright!" Their chosen charity is Myton Hospice.

Phoenix

The name Phoenix was used by popular demands. This house's symbolism is to rise from the ashes, much like a phoenix in mythology, but mainly this means to tackle difficulty and to succeed, becoming better than before. Phoenix is a reference to the fire which occurred in 2007, causing great damage to the school, but which allowed renovations to occur to the school. Their house colour is red. Their mottos are "In charge of our destiny." and "If we fall, we shall rise again." Their chosen charity is Cancer Research UK.

== Charity work ==
The school holds displays to raise awareness of World Refugee Day and in 2006 participated in the Motiv8 project. 16+ also holds an annual charity week in which they raise as much money as possible for an international charity and a charity more closer to home.

== Sidney Stringer Multi Academy Trust ==
Sidney Stringer Academy works within their "multi-academy trust" to cooperate concerning funds with other schools.

The Trust consists of:

- Sidney Stringer Academy,
- Ernesford Grange Community Academy,
- Radford Primary School,
- Riverbank Academy
- Sidney Stringer Primary School (since 2015).

=== North West Federation ===
Along with Barr's Hill School and Community College and the President Kennedy School, Sidney Stringer Academy forms the North West Federation of Schools, which are allowed to provide the International General Certificate of Secondary Education English course to pupils at these schools.

== Notable staff ==
=== Sidney Stringer School and Community College ===
- Estelle Morris, Labour politician and former Secretary of State for Education and Skills.

== See also ==
- Abraham Moss Community School
- Stantonbury International School
