= Thibault Vinçon =

French film and theater actor (born 1976)

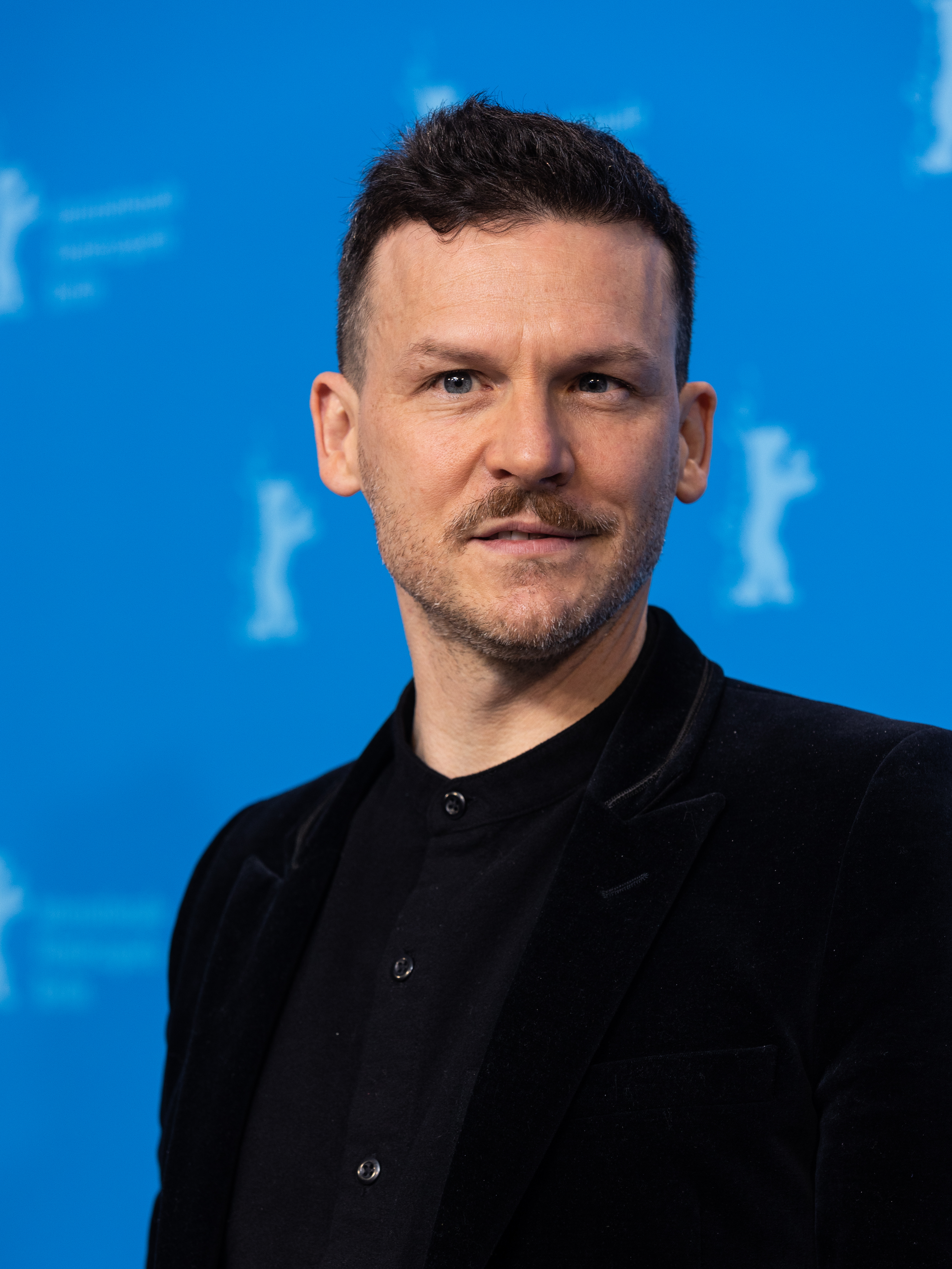
- Vinçon at the 72nd Berlin International Film Festival, 2022
- Born: 15 July 1976 (age 49); Paris, France
- Occupation: Actor
- Years active: 2003–present

Thibault Vinçon (born 15 July 1976) is a French film and theater actor.

== Career ==
He studied at the French National Academy of Dramatic Arts in Paris.

In 2010, asked which actors he particularly admired, named Jean-Louis Trintignant, Michel Piccoli, Gérard Depardieu and Jack Nicholson.

2014 saw him as Steve Jobs in the premiere of the opera Steve V (King different) by Roland Auzet et Fabrice Melquiot in Lyon.

== Selected filmography ==
=== Film ===
- 2004: Le Dernier Jour (as Mathieu) directed by Rodolphe Marconi (English title: The Last Day)
- 2006: Poison Friends (as André Morney) directed by Emmanuel Bourdieu (Original French title: Les Amitiés maléfiques) for which he won Étoile d’or de la révélation masculine française
- 2007: La Vie d'artiste (as Cora's neighbour) directed by Marc Fitoussi
- 2007: Primrose Hill (as Xavier) directed by Mikhael Hers
- 2007: Les Deux Mondes (as Simon Bassano, brother of Rémy) directed by Daniel Cohen (English title: Two Worlds)
- 2008: Un cœur simple (as Frédéric) directed by Marion Laine (English title: A Simple Heart)
- 2008: Nés en 68 (as Vincent) directed by Olivier Ducastel and Jacques Martineau (English title: Born in 68)
- 2009: Noir océan (as Dedekene) directed by Marion Hänsel
- 2010: Memory Lane (as Vincent) directed by Mikhaël Hers
- 2010: Le Sentiment de la chair (as Benoît) directed by Roberto Garzelli
- 2011: Le Roman de ma femme (as Alexandre) directed by Jamshed Usmonov (English title: My Wife's Romance)
- 2012: Cornouaille (as Thomas) directed by Anne Le Ny
- 2013: Le verrou directed by Laurent Laffargue (short film)
- 2013: Une autre vie directed by Emmanuel Mouret (English title: Another Life)
- 2014: Le souffleur de l'Affaire (as Edmond Rostand) directed by Isabelle Prim
- 2015: Un homme idéal (as Stanislas Richer) directed by Yann Gozlan (English title: A Perfect Man)
- 2016: Ce sentiment de l'été (as David) directed by Mikhaël Hers (English title: This Summer Feeling)
- 2016: Trip directed by Pascal Stervinou
- 2023: Les trois mousquetaires: D'Artagnan and Les trois mousquetaires : Milady (as Horace Saint Blancard) directed by Martin Bourboulon (English title: The Three Musketeers: D'Artagnan)

=== Television ===
- 2002: Joséphine, ange gardien (TV Series / 1 Episode), directed by Stéphane Kurc (role : Alexis)
- 2009: L'École du pouvoir (miniseries) directed by Raoul Peck (role: Matt Ribeiro)
- 2009: Les Héritières directed by Harry Cleven
- 2009: Sous un autre jour directed by Alain Tasma
- 2013: Drumont, histoire d'un antisémite français, historical television movie by Emmanuel Bourdieu
- 2014: Meurtre à Pacot directed by Raoul Peck (English title: Murder in Pacot)
- 2016: Innocente directed by Lionel Bailliu

== Theatre ==
- 2010: Lorenzaccio directed by Claudia Stavisky, at Théâtre des Célestins as Lorenzo de Médicis
- 2011: Le Dragon d'Or directed by Claudia Stavisky, at Théâtre des Céléstins
- 2012: Le Bourgeois gentilhomme directed by Denis Podalydès, at Théâtre des Bouffes du Nord as the Maître de danse and Cléonte
- 2013: Les Criminels directed by Richard Brunel, at Théâtre de la Colline
- 2014: Steve V king different directed by Roland Auzet, at Opéra de Lyon / Théâtre de la Renaissance
- 2015: Un fils de notre temps directed by Simon Delétang, at Théâtre des Célestins
- 2016: Roberto Zucco directed by Richard Brunel, at TGP
- 2016 - 2017: Le Bourgeois gentilhomme directed by Denis Podalydès, at the Théâtre des Bouffes du Nord
- 2017: The Three Sisters, adaptation and direction by Simon Stone, Théâtre de l'Odéon.
- 2018: Le Triomphe de l'amour by Marivaux, directed by Denis Podalydès, Théâtre des Bouffes du Nord as Agis
- 2020: Iphigénie de Jean Racine, directed by Stéphane Braunschweig, Odéon-Théâtre de l'Europe
- 2021: King Lear by William Shakespeare, directed by Georges Lavaudant, Théâtre de la Porte Saint-Martin, as Edgar
- 2023: The Storm by Alexander Ostrovski, directed by Denis Podalydès, Théâtre des Bouffes du Nord
- 2024: Le Bourgeois gentilhomme directed by Denis Podalydès, at Opéra de Versailles as the Maître de danse and Cléonte
- 2024 : Le Misanthrope directed by Simon Delétang at the Théâtre de Lorient, as Alceste

== Awards and nominations ==
- Étoile d'or de la révélation masculine for his role in the film Les Amitiés maléfiques, directed by Emmanuel Bourdieu (2007)
