= Primrose Hill (film) =

- Release poster
- Directed by: Mikhaël Hers
- Written by: Mikhaël Hers
- Produced by: Florence Auffret
- Starring: Hubert Benhamdine; Stéphanie Daub-Laurent; Thibault Vinçon; Jeanne Candel; Mila Dekker
- Cinematography: Sébastien Buchmann
- Edited by: Isabelle Manquillet
- Production company: Les Films de la Grande Ourse
- Release date: 24 May 2007 (France)
- Running time: 57 minutes
- Country: France
- Language: French

Primrose Hill is a 2007 French medium-length, psychological drama film directed and written by Mikhaël Hers.

Starring an ensemble cast of Hubert Benhamdine, Stéphanie Daub-Laurent, Thibault Vinçon, and Jeanne Candel, it follows four friends in their late twenties – the remaining members of an amateur five-person pop band – during a walk through the Parc de Saint-Cloud. Their conversations about stalled ambitions, work, and relationships are interwoven with voice-over narrations from the group's fifth, missing member (Mila Dekker), who reminisces about a shared trip of the group to the film's namesake, London's Primrose Hill.

The film explores themes of unresolved loss, the passage of time, and the melancholy and disillusionment of adulthood against a backdrop of English pop music.

== Plot ==
The film takes place on Christmas Eve in Paris and follows four friends in their late twenties – Stéphane, Joëlle, Xavier, and Sonia – as they reunite for a day-long walk through the Parc de Saint-Cloud. Their journey is interwoven with voice-over narrations from Stéphane's sister, Sylvia, who has been missing for some time. Mostly, she reminisces about a photograph taken years earlier of the five of them together during a summer trip to Primrose Hill in London.

The film opens with Sylvia's voice describing a dream in which a woman she later realizes is herself futilely calls out to her four friends sitting in a park. The woman sings a melody that Sylvia finds familiar, one she speculates the five of them may have once played together.

Back in reality, as the four friends finish a music rehearsal and begin their walk, it becomes clear their collective musical ambitions have stalled. Joëlle, a teacher working on a long-delayed PhD thesis on Balzac's La Comédie humaine, laments to Stéphane that their conversations are always limited to music. Xavier is deeply disillusioned with his job at a local media library, complaining about the pretentious customers he serves. Sonia is the only one still performing, but she faces criticism from Stéphane and Xavier for "selling out" by playing with a raggamuffin band in Marseille, a departure from their shared pop ideals (to make ends meet, she also participates in paid medical trials).

Their walk is punctuated by encounters that highlight the changes in their lives. Stéphane suggests an impromptu visit to the house of an old acquaintance, Marc, where some are surprised to learn he has a two-month-old daughter. Marc's partner tells them he is playing football in the park, so they head off to meet him. On the way there, Xavier receives a phone call from his friend Mehdi, asking them to visit his brother, Riccardo, who is in the hospital after falling six stories from a balcony.

During a conversation between Xavier and Stéphane, it is revealed that Marc was Sylvia's boyfriend for four years, though they had broken up a year before she disappeared. Shortly after, they find Marc playing football in the park with a friend, and the group joins them in a nostalgic, melancholic game.

After the game, at an outdoor café, the friends confront their collective inertia. Stéphane urges them to "shake themselves" and restart their music careers, but the others are resigned to their circumstances. Joëlle points out they are all tied down: Xavier at the library, Sonia in Marseille, Stéphane with his soundproofing work, and herself with teaching and her thesis. Following this, the group visits the hospital to see Riccardo; Xavier and Sonia go in, while Stéphane and Joëlle wait outside, making small talk.

As evening falls, the group disbands. Xavier heads to work, and Sonia prepares to go her own way. Stéphane and Joëlle continue walking together as it gets dark. Joëlle gently presses Stéphane about Sylvia, asking if there has been any news. He reveals the police had a false sighting near Dijon months ago but says he finds it difficult to talk about, as he expects no good news. Joëlle encourages him to be more open and suggests they meet up after their respective family dinners.

Later that night, Stéphane throws a pebble at Joëlle's window. She lets him into her childhood bedroom, and they share a quiet, awkward intimacy, surrounded by record sleeves she has tacked to her walls. Their conversation leads to a kiss, which evolves into a long, clumsy, and tender intimate scene – evidently, the first of its kind for the two lifelong friends.

Stéphane bikes home to his parents' apartment, where he finds both of them awake, watching TV. As his mother goes to bed, Stéphane's father tells him she is not doing well – she recently went to Sylvia's empty apartment once more and brought back her notebooks. He says they have read them again, but they contain no clues – only diary entries that stop the day before she left. He offers to let Stéphane stay with them while he pursues his music anew. Left alone, Stéphane looks through his sister's notebooks.

The film concludes with Sylvia's final voice-over, possibly words from her notebooks. She recalls figuring out the melody from her dream, connecting it to their trip to Primrose Hill and their "musical cartography of the city" – visiting places mentioned in the lyrics of their favorite songs. As she describes the vibrant colours and dazzling sunlight of the old London photograph of the five of them, the image freezes on the four friends walking together in the present-day Paris winter park.

== Cast ==
- Hubert Benhamdine as Stéphane
- Stéphanie Daub-Laurent as Joëlle
- Thibault Vinçon as Xavier
- Jeanne Candel as Sonia
- Mila Dekker as Sylvia
- Alain Libolt as Stéphane's father
- Mona Heftre as Stéphane's mother
- Michael Stokes as Marc
- Sophie Letourneur as Marc's partner
- Timothée Régnier as Marc's friend
- Wissam Charaf as Medhi
- Gabriel Axtmeyer as the elderly man

== Music ==
Music is central to the film's melancholic tone and reflects the characters' shared passion. Even though it features two original songs, the film mostly relies on what Le Cinéma Club called "a soundtrack of overlooked indie-rock classics." The following seven songs are featured in the film:

- "Over Primrose Hill" – performed by The Adventure Babies
- "On the Lightship Way" – performed by Martin Newell
- "Karen" – performed by The Little Rabbits
- "A Preacher in New England" – performed by Felt
- "Fat Horse" – performed by The New Government
- "Understand" – performed by Brian
- "1986 Summer Fire" – performed by Boards of Canada

== Reception ==
=== Critical response ===
Writing for the blog Inisfree, Vincent Jourdan described Primrose Hill as the "most fascinating film" of the 2008 Clermont-Ferrand festival. He praised its "remarkable winter atmosphere" and the cinematography by Buchmann, noting that the melancholic charm of the English pop soundtrack made the film an "endearing, literally remarkable work." He particularly highlighted the award-winning performance of Daub-Laurent as being "full of finesse and charm."

=== Awards and festivals ===
The film was screened as part of the International Critics' Week at the 2007 Cannes Film Festival and was also selected for the São Paulo International Film Festival the same year. It received several accolades on the festival circuit:

Festival	Year	Award	Recipient	Result
Clermont-Ferrand International Short Film Festival	2008	ADAMI Award for Best Actress	Stéphanie Daub-Laurent	Won
Côté Court Festival	2008	Press Award	Mikhaël Hers	Won
Côté Court Festival	2008	Grand Prix (Fiction)	Mikhaël Hers	Nominated
Brive Mid-Length Film Meeting	2008	Grand Prix (National Competition)	Mikhaël Hers	Nominated
