= Ernesford Grange Community Academy =

Location
- Princethorpe Way; Coventry, West Midlands, CV3 2QD; England; 52.39528°N 1.45634°W

Information
- Type: Academy
- Motto: Together we achieve
- Established: 1972
- Trust: Sidney Stringer Multi Academy Trust
- Department for Education URN: 140366 Tables
- Ofsted: Reports
- Gender: Coeducational
- Age: 11 to 19
- Website: https://www.egacademy.org.uk/

Ernesford Grange Community Academy (formerly Ernesford Grange School) is a secondary comprehensive school with sixth form facilities in the Ernesford Grange area of Coventry, England.

The school has a very mixed catchment area and, as such, is above the national average for proportion of students receiving free school meals and students with special educational needs. Despite the fact that most students enter the school with below average Key Stage 2 results, Key Stage 3 and 4 results are above that of similar schools. Value added scores show how well the school is doing.

It is a major part of the Riverside partnership which links several schools in the local area into a consortium to offer a wider range of subjects at A Level. The school motto is "Together we Achieve".

== History ==
The school was built in 1972 as one of the first suburban community colleges in the country. The River Sowe borders part of the school grounds. Over the past few years, the school has been through major changes in both structure and organisation. Many of the blocks have been rebuilt or renovated and the timetable has been rearranged. In 1984 the sports building was set ablaze and destroyed in an arson attack. In 2005, it gained specialist school status in science and is currently the only specialist Science College in the city. The school converted to academy status on 1 January 2014 and was renamed Ernesford Grange Community Academy. Plans to increase capacity at Ernest Grange and the adjoining Riverbank special education school were announced in 2020 and the work was completed in 2022.
