= Hillfields =

Suburb of Coventry, England

Coordinates: 52.413°N 1.497°W

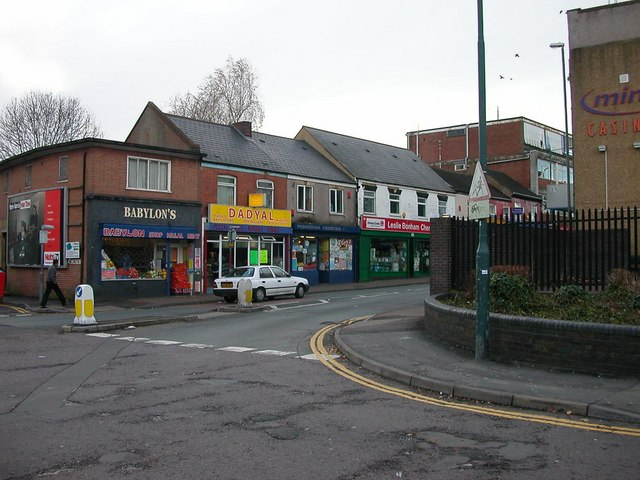
Victoria Street, Hillfields, Coventry

Hillfields is a suburb of Coventry in the West Midlands of England. It is situated north of Coventry city centre, and has undergone a series of name changes throughout its history originally called "Harnall" and has seen itself change from a village, to a remote suburb, to a large postwar redevelopment zone.

Hillfields is one of the areas of the city with the highest number of refugees. Originally Irish communities, South Asian and West Indian communities settled in the mid 20th century. Hillfields used to be home to Coventry City Football Club on the Highfield Road stadium until the club relocated to the Coventry Building Society Arena. Hillfields is also home to Sidney Stringer Academy and it additionally includes Primrose Hill Park.

== History ==
=== Middle ages ===
Hillfields was originally known as Harnall and was a district under the Holy Trinity Parish. Harnall was first mentioned in Coombe Abbey Charter as being in the ownership of the Prior's Half of Coventry in the 12th century. It was again mentioned in the 12th century in a passage noting a road that lead "through the middle of Harnall along the country of Stoke". In the 13th century, Harnall was owned by Roger de Montalt and was one of his estates consisting of little more than cottages and crofts. Before this, the Coventry Priory had owned land in Harnall.

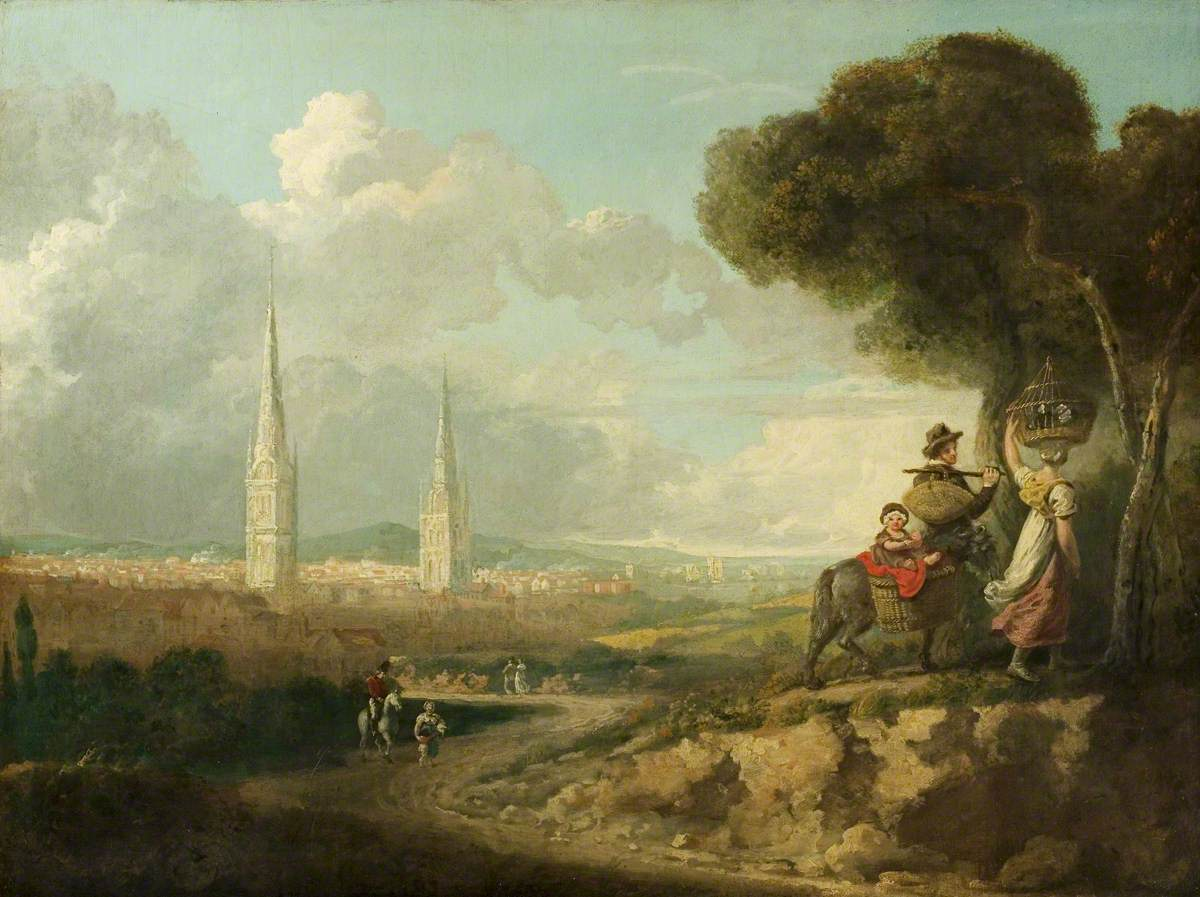
Coventry as seen from Hillfields in c. 1807, as shown in the painting Coventry from Hillfields, Warwickshire by Edward Rudge

=== Early modern ===
In 1542, the land was given by the Priory to the corporation, and in 1551 the Prior's Orchard with Swans Pool, New Pool, Harnall Field and other land were included in the endowment of Sir Thomas White's Charity. In 1632, Prior's Orchard Mill, located near Springfield Brook and Swanswell Pool, was absorbed into Swanswell Waterworks. The waterworks produced water for Coventry.

=== Modern period ===
In 1816, the first school in the area is recorded as being located within Primrose Hill House, which had been converted to serve as a school. This closed in 1837; however, it was reopened as a boarding school in 1848 by Rev. J. S. Gilbert and T. Wyles.

In 1828, Harnall became the first suburb in Coventry after the city expanded outside the city walls. This resulted in the construction of villas throughout the suburb. It became known as New Town. Problems arose soon after its incorporation into Coventry when the River Sherbourne, which separated the two areas, began to flood as a result of two mills. These two mills were finally removed in 1844 by an Act of Parliament. Once the two mills were removed, New Town could develop and connect to Coventry.

The Health of Towns Act 1848 resulted in the establishment of a Local Board of Health in 1849 who then surveyed the city in 1850. A result of the survey was new building guidelines for the city. As much of the city had already been developed, Hillfields became a favourable location for new houses and the area began to expand. Also, the standard of living in Hillfields was much higher than those who remained in the slums within Coventry city.

The motor industry in Coventry boomed at the start of the 20th century and by 1905, there were 20 motor manufacturers in Hillfields alone. In the 1930s, the Singer Company became Coventry's largest manufacturer and it operated five different sites in Hillfields.

== Second World War destruction and redevelopment ==
The war saw Hillfields being bombed by the Luftwaffe due to its industrial nature. During the war, 192 houses in Hillfields were totally destroyed or demolished and nearly 1450 were seriously damaged. During the post-war period, the population of the area halved due to relocation.

The Town and Country Planning Act 1944 allowed local authorities to declare Areas of Comprehensive Development, and Hillfields was declared one of three in Coventry in 1951. It was declared that 53% of the houses were unfit to live in within the next five years, and this gave the local authorities the right to use Compulsory Purchase Orders on the properties.

Redevelopment of the area began in the early 1960s with the intention of housing a population of 6,000 people in high-density areas. Halfway through the decade, three mid-rise tower blocks had been completed, with two more larger ones being under construction and in planning. Upon the completion of the construction, thirteen tower blocks had been built. Some of these tower blocks have since been demolished. By 1970, it was estimated that less than 50% of properties in Hillfields had access to hot water and an indoor toilet and bath.

In the 1970s, the view changed and the aim was to modernise and improve the existing older houses. An area once proposed for clearance was designated "General Improvement Area" status, which allowed residents a budget for improving the environment and house. The final council housing estate was built in 1979 in the Brook Street area. The housing improvement scheme also ended in the 1980s with grants being offered to those in most need of care instead of whole areas.

In 1899, Coventry City Football Club built a stadium at Highfield Road in the area. They played there for 106 years until 2005 when they relocated to the Ricoh Arena at Foleshill. The stadium was demolished the following year and redeveloped for housing, although the pitch was retained as public open space.

The Mercer's Arms pub was for many years a jazz venue, hosting both the local 1920s/30s-style Dud Clews Jazz Orchestra and modern-jazz musicians who would travel from London. It was demolished in the early 2000s.

== Demographics ==
(According to 2021 census)

- White —32.7%
- Asian (including Asian British and Asian Welsh) — 33.6%
- Black (including Black British, Black Welsh, Caribbean or African) — 21.0%
- Mixed ethnicity — 5.3%
- Other ethnic group — 7.4%

40% of the population is Muslim, 33.6% Christian, 5% Hindu, and 2.1% Sikh.

In 2021, a quarter of households in Coventry had no one who spoke English as their main language. 8.3% of residents were reported as having little or no capacity to speak English.

== Education ==
Sidney Stringer Academy is the coeducational secondary school for the area. There was a large fire at the school on 25 September 2007 in which about 60% of the school was burnt down.

== Coventry City Farm ==
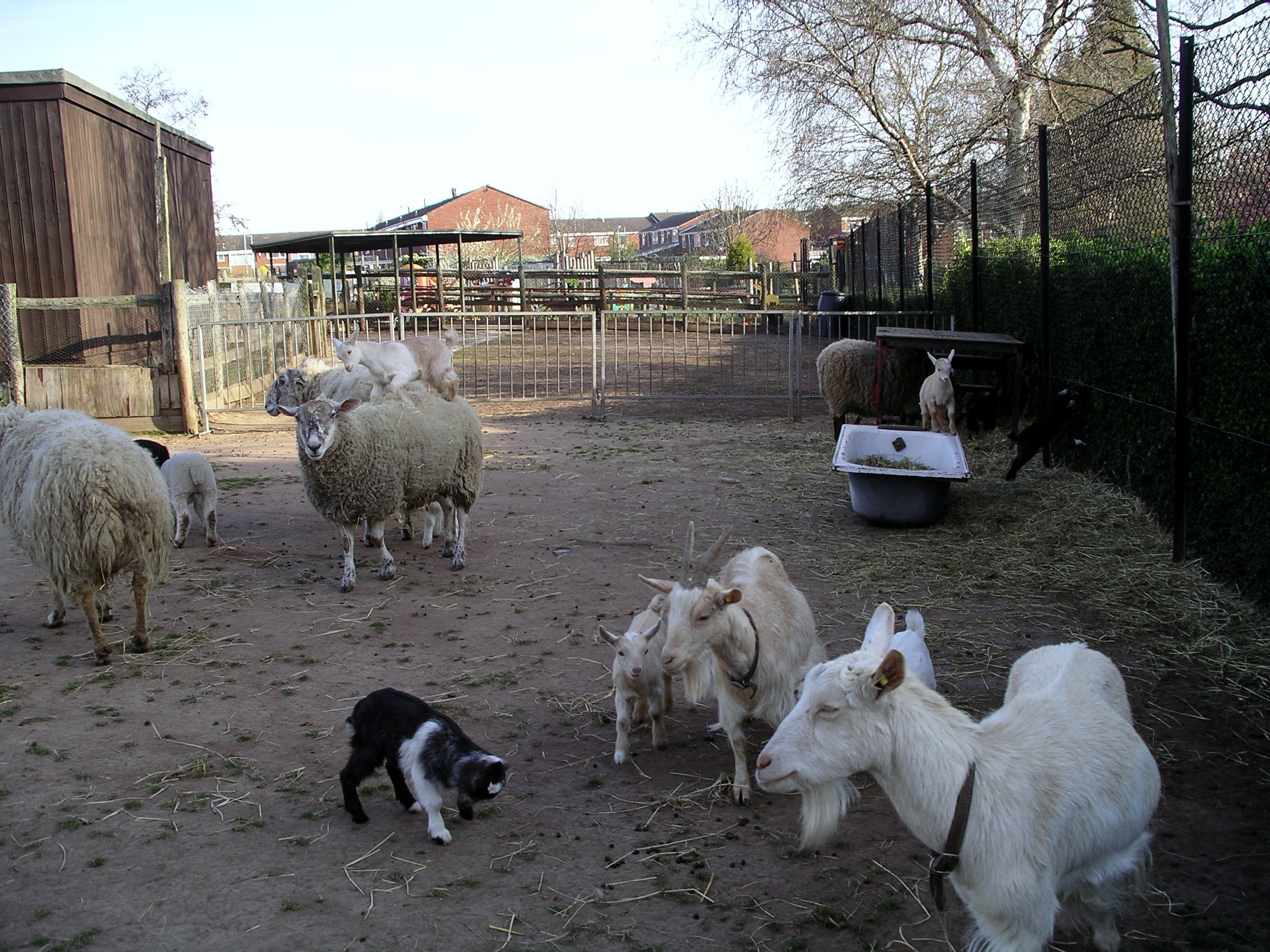
Goats and sheep at Coventry City Farm

Coventry City Farm, opened in 1983, was based on a small plot situated off Clarence Street, Hillfields. It was surrounded by the houses, flats and roads of Hillfields. Its main purpose was to show some aspects of farms and a few farm animals to local children who might not get out to the countryside very often. The farm was closed on 12 March 2008 after financial difficulties which became first apparent in early 2007.
