= Coventry Airport =

Airport in Warwickshire, England (1936–2026)

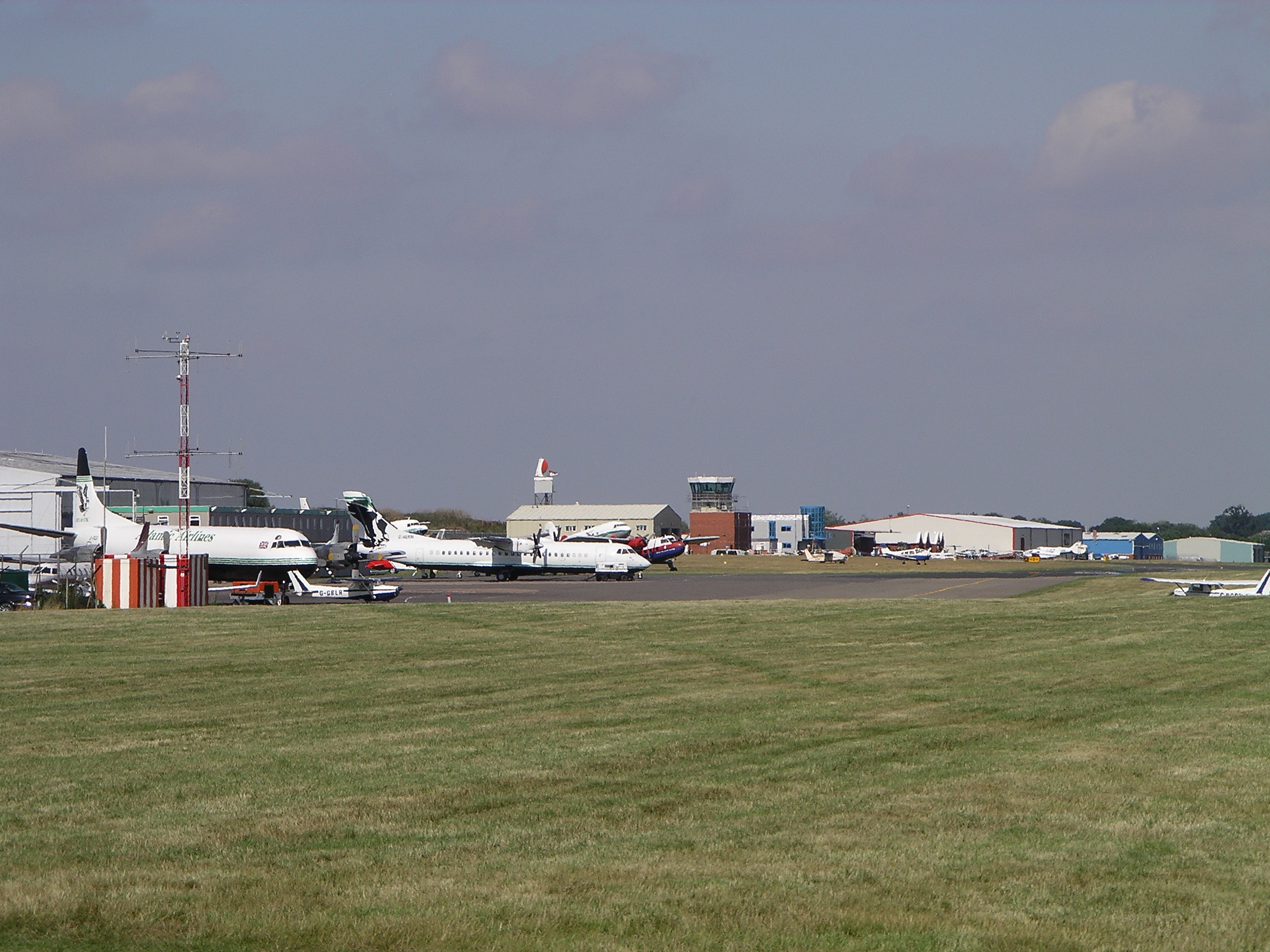
- IATA: CVT; ICAO: EGBE

Summary
- Airport type: Defunct
- Serves: Coventry
- Location: Baginton, Warwickshire, England
- Opened: 1936
- Closed: 11 June 2026
- Passenger services ceased: 9 November 2008
- Elevation AMSL: 267 ft (81 m)
- Coordinates: 52°22′21″N 001°28′47″W

Map
- Location in Warwickshire

Runways
Direction	Length		Surface
Direction	m	ft	Surface
05/23	2,008	6,588	Asphalt
- Sources: UK AIP at NATS; Statistics from the UK Civil Aviation Authority

Coventry Airport (IATA: CVT, ICAO: EGBE) was an aerodrome three nautical miles (six kilometres) south-southeast of Coventry city centre, in the village of Baginton, Warwickshire, England.

Flight operations ended on 9 May, with final closure on 11 June 2026. Development has begun to replace the site with a car battery gigafactory.

== History ==
First opened in 1936 as Baginton Aerodrome, Coventry Airport has been used for general aviation, flight training, and commercial freight and passenger flights, as well as being a Second World War fighter airfield. In 1982, Pope John Paul II celebrated Mass with a crowd of around 350,000 on his only UK visit. In 1994–1995, it became a focus for animal rights campaigners who protested at the export of live animals from the airport as freight. From 2004 to 2008, Thomsonfly operated scheduled jet passenger flights from temporary hub facilities at Coventry. A controversial plan to build permanent passenger terminal facilities was rejected by the High Court in 2007. Following financial problems, the airport was briefly closed in 2009, before re-opening as a commercial airport in 2010.

=== Creation and growth ===
In 1933, Coventry City Council decided to develop a civil airport on land that it owned to the south-east of the city in Baginton. Coventry Airport was opened in 1936. Armstrong Whitworth, an aircraft manufacturer based nearby at Whitley Aerodrome, built an aircraft factory on the airport site soon afterwards.

During the Second World War, the airport was used as a fighter station, RAF Baginton, by the Royal Air Force. It was damaged in the 1940 Coventry Blitz bombing raid by the Luftwaffe.

The following units were here at some point:

- A detachment of No. 6 Anti-Aircraft Co-operation Unit RAF (December 1940)
- No. 32 Squadron RAF
- A flight of No. 63 Operational Training Unit RAF (September – October 1943)
- No. 79 (Madras Presidency) Squadron RAF
- No. 134 Squadron RAF
- No. 135 Squadron RAF
- No. 308 Polish Fighter Squadron
- No. 403 Squadron RCAF
- No. 457 Squadron RAAF
- No. 605 (County of Warwick) Squadron AAF (1941)
- Camouflage Flight RAF (October – November 1939) became No. 1 Camouflage Unit RAF (November 1939 – September 1940)
- Special Duties Flight RAF (1941)

The site was used under No. 9 Group RAF, RAF Fighter Command, had a pundit code of NG with 3 grass runways and became a Sector Station from September 1940 before being downgraded to a satellite of RAF Honiley from August 1941.

After the war, the airport was returned to civil use as a passenger and freight terminal. In the 1950s, Jersey Airlines operated de Havilland Heron and Douglas DC-3 aircraft on services to the Channel Islands. In the 1960s, British United Airways flew DC-3s, Aviation Traders Carvairs (which also carried passengers' cars) and Handley Page Dart Heralds to the Channel Islands.

Activity at the airport in the 1960s included glider flights, and in the 1970s several Open Days were held at Baginton. These featured historic aircraft, including on one occasion a de Havilland Puss Moth, a Bucker Jungmeister, and a Messerschmitt 108, as well as various commercial vendors.

During the 1980s, West Midlands based travel agents Hards Travel started using the airport with its Vickers Viscount and Dart Herald aircraft for holidays to Spain, Italy and Austria, flying to Beauvais in France and Ostend Airport, operating under the Janus Airways banner. The holiday brands used were Summer-Plan, and HTS Holidays.

In the late 1980s, Coventry City Council sold the airport lease to Air Atlantique. During the late 1990s and early 2000s, Marconi operated a Raytheon Hawker and a 20-seat Gulfstream for staff travelling between its UK head office in Coventry and its Italian head office in Genoa, as well as its North American head office in Pittsburgh.

=== Papal visit ===
Pope John Paul II visited the airport on 30 May 1982 as part of his six-day visit to Britain. He arrived in a gold and blue British Caledonian helicopter, and just after 10.00 a.m. he set off in a popemobile from the helipad to visit a crowd of about 350,000 people. He celebrated Mass and administered the sacrament of confirmation, and there was a carnival when he had lunch. He left in the helicopter at about 3.15 p.m.

=== Live veal calf exports ===
From 5 November 1994 to 4 May 1995, live veal calves were exported from Coventry Airport to Amsterdam for distribution across Europe, and the locality became a focus for animal rights demonstrators. On 21 December 1994, Air Algérie Flight 702P, a Boeing 737, used for exporting calves crashed in Willenhall Wood, Willenhall, Coventry near to houses, on approach to the airport in bad weather, all five people on board were killed. The aircraft was owned by Air Algerie and on lease to Phoenix Aviation. On 1 February 1995, Jill Phipps, a 31-year-old animal rights activist, was crushed to death under the wheels of a lorry carrying live veal calves into Coventry Airport.

=== Past airline services ===
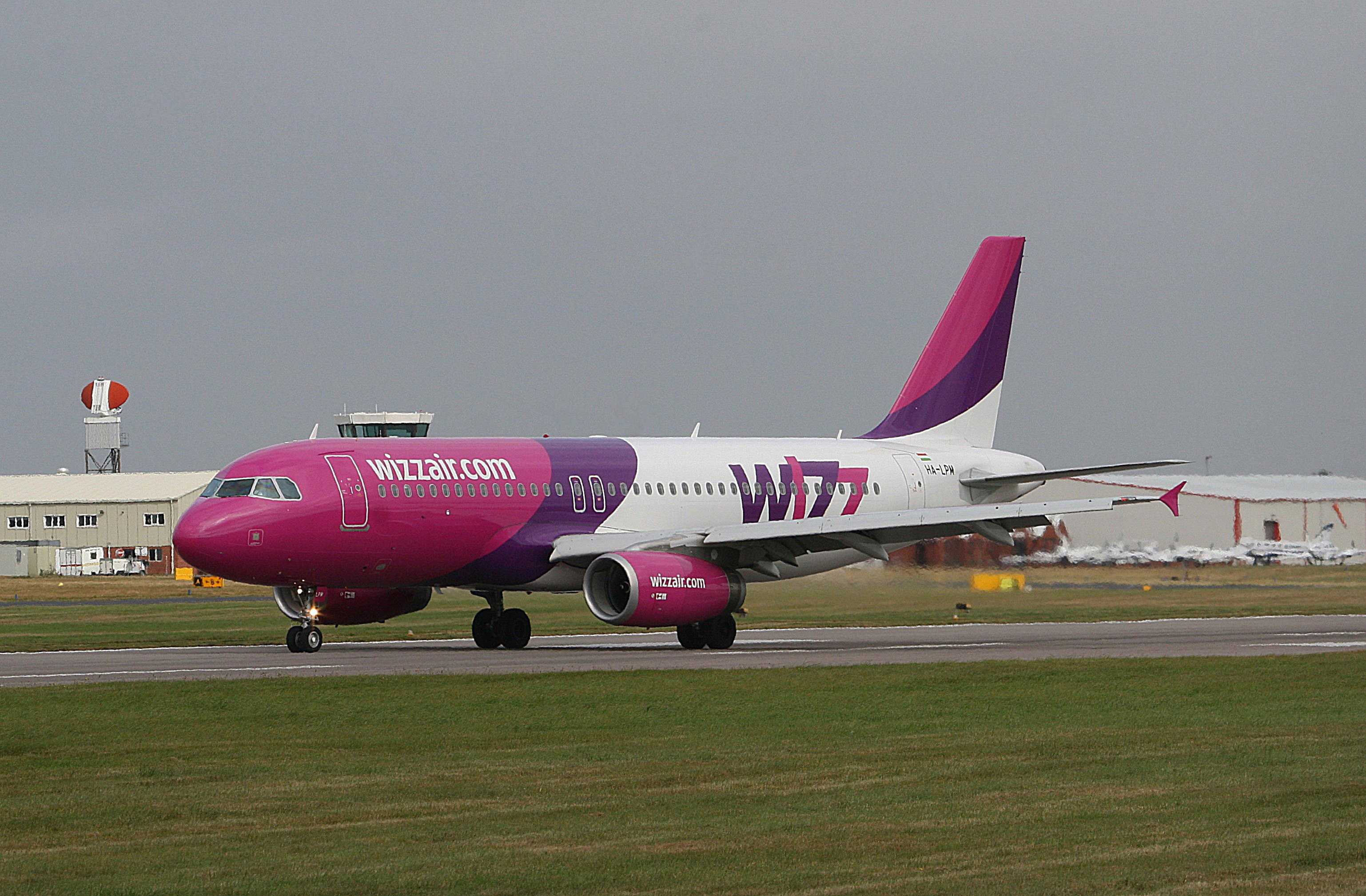
A Wizz Air Airbus A320 starting the take off (2007)

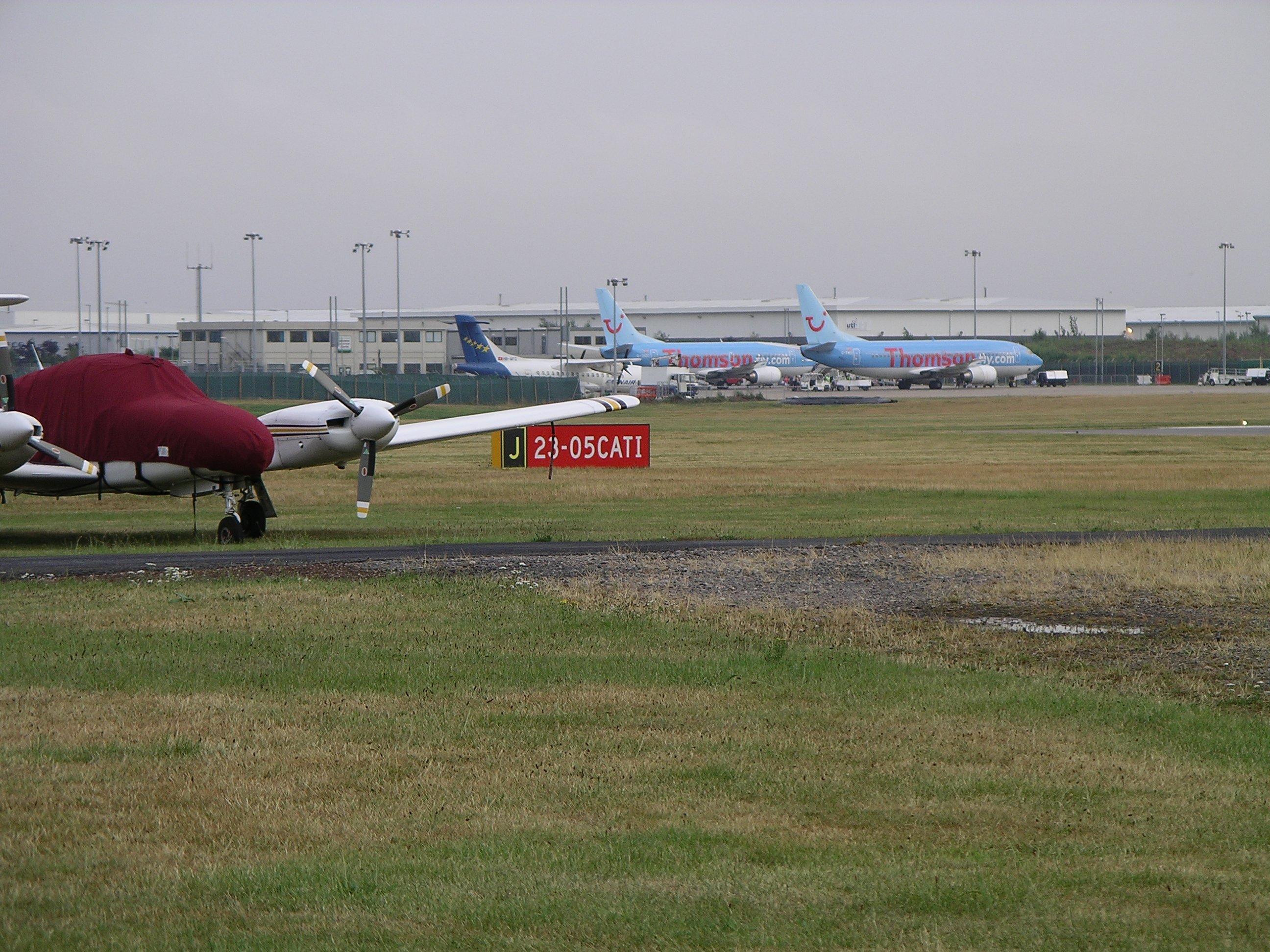
Two Thomsonfly Boeing 737s and a Farnair Switzerland ATR 42F on the ground

In February 2004, the airport lease was sold to TUI AG, which started scheduled international flights from a temporary passenger terminal building in March 2004 under the brand Thomsonfly using two Boeing 737s. The operation drew vociferous opposition from environmental campaigners, some local residents and Warwick District Council, but was supported by Coventry City Council. Warwick District Council unsuccessfully sought an injunction to stop flights, claiming that the temporary facilities were built without planning permission. Flights expanded through the following years, while the airport sought planning permission for a permanent passenger terminal and facilities. Thomsonfly expanded operations with more European flights and up to six aircraft based at the airport, while WizzAir also began regular flights to Poland.

After planning permission for a permanent passenger terminal was initially denied by Warwick District Council in 2004, two public inquiries took place, followed by an unsuccessful appeal by the airport owners to the UK government planning inspectorate, and finally to the High Court in 2008. The planning battle affected the confidence of flight operators. On 1 September 2008, Wizz Air confirmed it would not continue its seasonal service from Coventry to Gdańsk and Katowice. On 15 October 2008, Thomsonfly confirmed that it would cease operations at Coventry Airport, citing its increased focus on charter services after its merger with First Choice Airways. Scheduled passenger flights from Coventry ended on 9 November 2008. The airport continued with cargo operations, and was a base for executive jet services, general aviation and flight training, and the Warwickshire and Northamptonshire Air Ambulance.

=== Closure, sale and re-opening ===
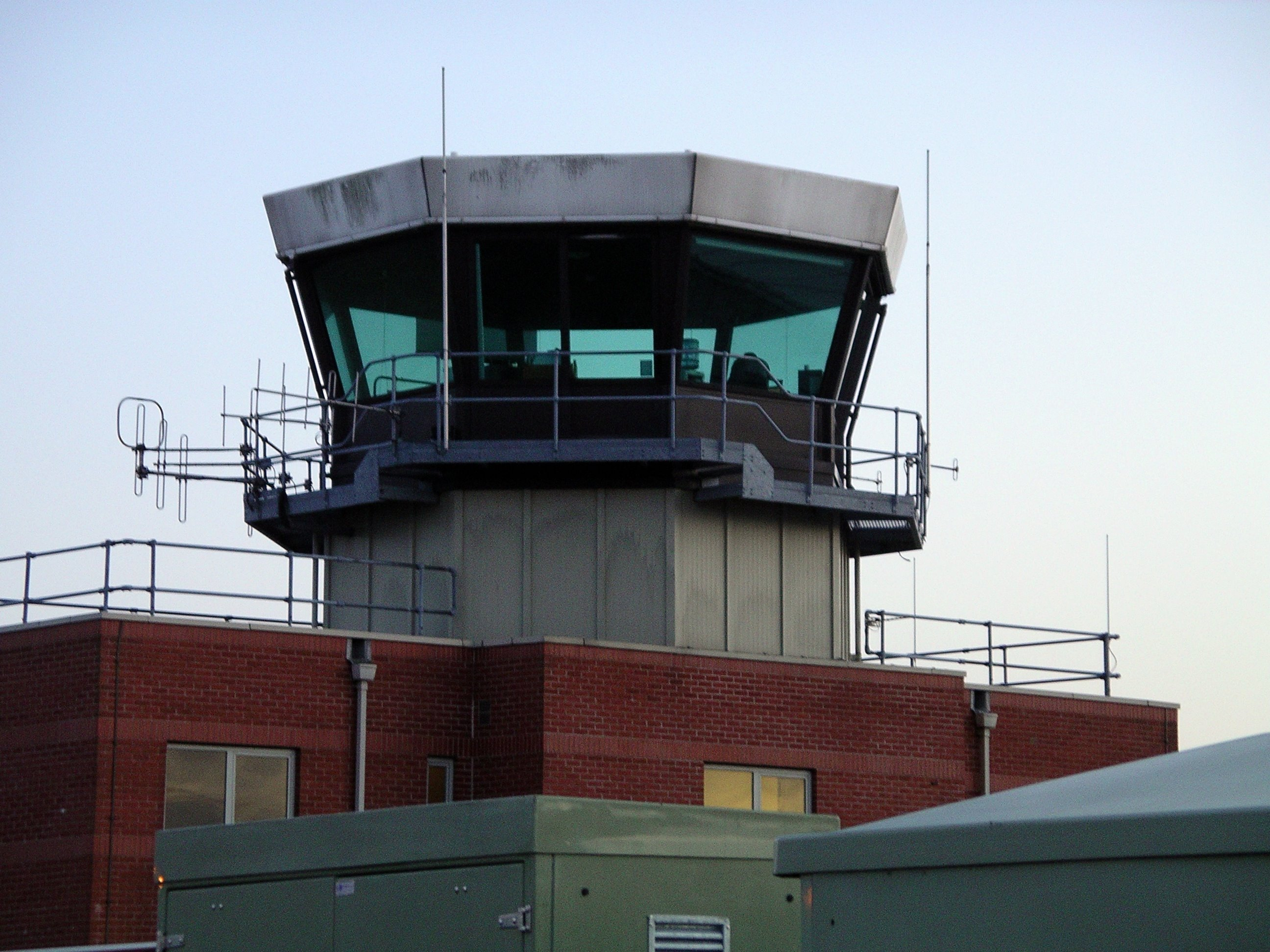
Control tower

In May 2009, Coventry Airport was put up for sale. The owners outsourced security, and also air traffic control to Marshall Aerospace. On 1 December 2009, it was reported that a petition was made by HM Revenue & Customs in the High Court to wind up the company, to the concern of local businesses. A hearing was due to take place at London's Royal Courts of Justice on Wednesday, 9 December 2009. On 8 December 2009, the CAA closed the airport with immediate effect, issuing a Notice to Airmen announcing the withdrawing of its operating licence. All commercial flying and flight training was suspended, although the Warwickshire & Northamptonshire Air Ambulance continued to use the airport as a base. The airport re-opened as an unlicensed airfield the following week, without air traffic control, to private traffic.

A Swiss firm announced its interest in acquiring the airport in early 2010, but did not conclude a bid. Sir Peter Rigby's Rigby Group took over ownership of Coventry Airport on 28 April, and it was fully re-opened in summer 2010.

=== Cancelled second Papal visit ===
As part of Pope Benedict XVI's planned visit to Britain in September 2010, it was announced that the centrepiece of the visit, the beatification of Cardinal John Henry Newman, would take place on 19 September at the airport, following the success of the 1982 visit of Pope John Paul II. However, it was subsequently announced in June 2010 that the preferred venue had changed to the smaller Cofton Park, in Birmingham.

=== Permanent closure ===
In February 2021, a joint venture partnership between Coventry City Council and The Rigby Group proposed to build a gigafactory producing batteries for electric cars on the Coventry Airport site creating around 4,000 jobs. Planning permission was granted for the site in 2022, and following an additional funding package of £23million from the West Midlands Combined Authority, it was announced in December 2025 the project would go ahead. The airport permanently closed on 11 June 2026, with development on the site starting soon after.

== Statistics ==
=== Accidents and incidents ===
- On 15 April 1969, Douglas DC-3D N4296 of Aviation Enterprises was destroyed by fire at Baginton Airport.
- On 30 May 1988 during the annual Warwickshire Air Pageant, 38 year old CFS RAF Flight Lieutenant Peter Stacey was killed in a Gloster Meteor T7, registration WF791, which lost altitude and crashed three miles away into a small area of open ground between the Willenhall and Ernesford Grange housing estates, apparently sacrificing his own life to save many others.
- On 21 December 1994, Air Algérie Flight 702P, an Air Algérie Boeing 737 aircraft (leased to Phoenix Aviation) crashed in Willenhall Wood on approach to Coventry. All five people (three crew and two passengers) on board were killed.
- On 31 May 2003, a reproduction of the Ryan M/1/M2 NYP "Spirit of St. Louis" crashed at an airshow after suffering a structural failure shortly after takeoff. The pilot, who was also the owner, was killed.
- On 17 August 2008, five people were killed when two light aircraft collided on their final approach into Coventry Airport. The aircraft involved were a Cessna 402C and a Rand KR-2. The Air Accident Investigation Board's report of crash concluded that "the two aircraft collided because their respective pilots either did not see the other aircraft, or did not see it in time to take effective avoiding action". In 2012, an inquest jury criticised poor monitoring and communication by staff at Coventry Airport. The jury also said the tower controller at the airport provided the Cessna 402 with "inaccurate information" about the other aircraft.
