= Primrose Hill Park =

Park in Coventry, England

Coordinates: 52.41270°N 1.49278°W

- Interactive map of Primrose Hill Park
- Type: Public park
- Nearest city: Coventry, England
- Operator: Coventry City Council

Primrose Hill Park is a public park in the Hillfields district of Coventry.

== Giant's Grave ==
Giant's Grave tumulus

The Giant's Grave was a prehistoric burial mound which was about eight feet high. It had trees growing on it until houses were built nearby around 1910. The trees were then felled and the mound was buried under soil to form part of the back gardens of the housing.

== Second World War ==
During the Second World War, Hillfields was industrial and so the target of German air raids. Trenches and shelters were dug in the park to protect the local populace.
