= Mikhaël Hers =

French film director

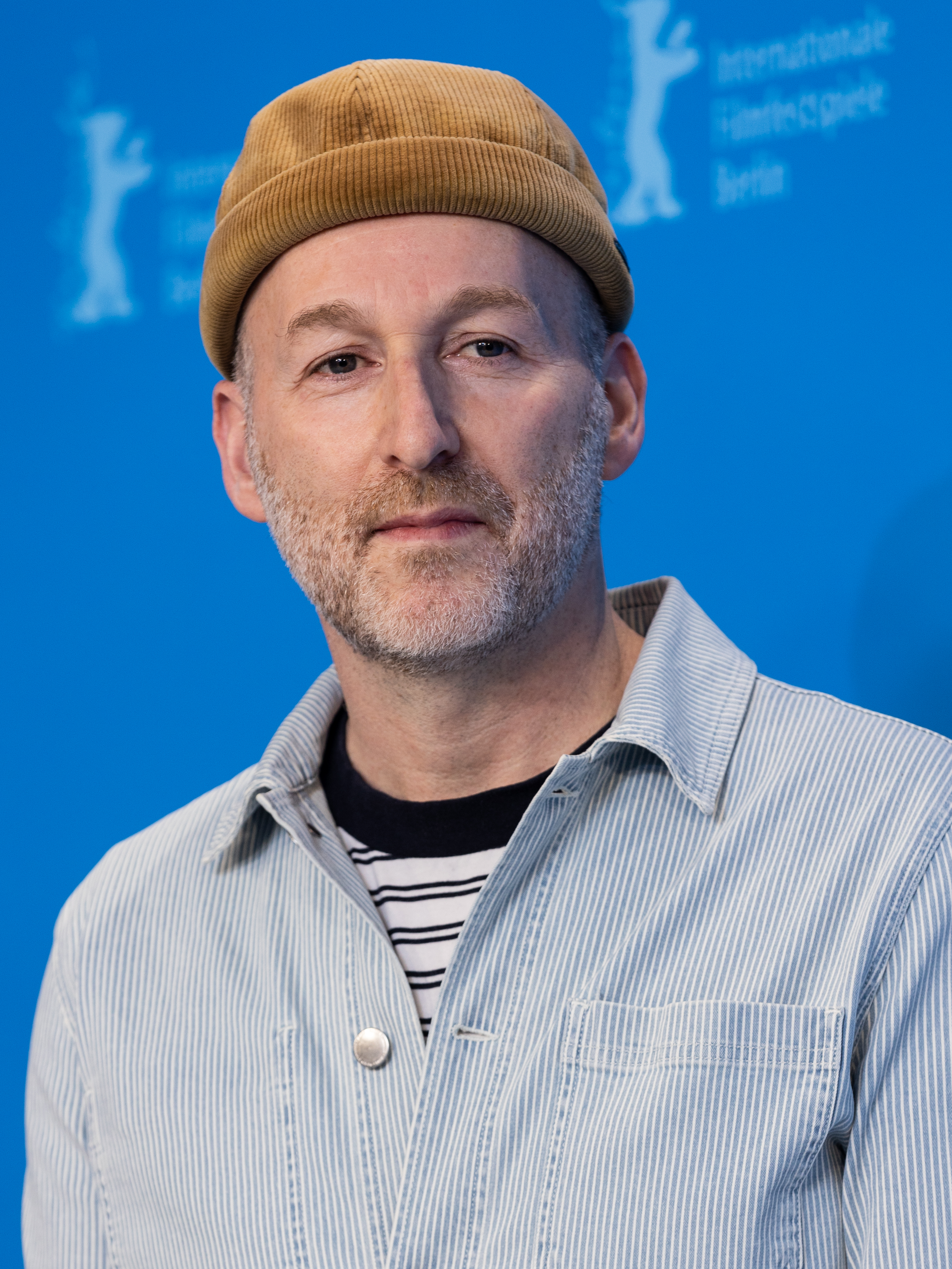
- Hers at the Berlinale 2022
- Born: 6 February 1975 (age 51); Paris, France
- Occupations: Film director Screenwriter
- Years active: 2003–present

Mikhaël Hers (French: [mikaɛl ɛʁs]; born 6 February 1975) is a French film director and screenwriter.

His directorial credits includes Memory Lane (2010), This Summer Feeling (2015) and Amanda (2018) among others. His latest film The Passengers of the Night (2022) premiered at the 72nd Berlin International Film Festival, where it competed for the Golden Bear.

== Career ==
After studying at La Fémis in the production section, from which he graduated in 2004. In 2006 he made his first medium-length film, Charell, adapted from a novel by Patrick Modiano. The film was notably selected for Critics' Week at the Cannes Film Festival.

In 2007, he directed Primrose Hill, also selected for Critics' Week and awarded at Clermont-Ferrand. In 2009, his third medium-length film, Montparnasse won the Jean-Vigo prize and was awarded at the Directors' Fortnight in Cannes that same year.

In 2010, he directed his first feature, Memory Lane, shown for the first time at the Locarno International Film Festival . The film is released in France in November 2010. In 2015, he shot his second feature film, This Summer Feeling.

In 2018, his film Amanda won the Grand Prize and Best Screenplay award at the Tokyo International Film Festival.

From 3 to 12 September 2021, he was a member of the jury of the 47th Deauville American Film Festival, chaired by Charlotte Gainsbourg.

His 2022's The Passengers of the Night had its world premiere at the main competition of the 72nd Berlin International Film Festival, where it was nominated for the Golden Bear.

== Filmography ==
Year	English Title	Original Title	Notes
2006	Charell		
2007	Primrose Hill		
2009	Montparnasse		
2010	Memory Lane		
2015	This Summer Feeling	Ce sentiment de l'été	
2018	Amanda		
2022	The Passengers of the Night	Les Passagers de la nuit	
2026	Between Now And Then	Une autre histoire	Post-production

=== Only writer ===
Year	Title	Notes
2003	An Embrace	Short film
