= Larkman =

Larkman is an Anglo Saxon surname used in the UK, United States, Australia, New Zealand and Canada. Although Larkman is a very uncommon name it is not historically rare in Norfolk, England and it is possible that all Larkmans originated from Norfolk. Research carried out by Frank Randall and Brian Larkman has revealed that only a handful of Larkmans can be found outside Norfolk and Suffolk before 1800.

== History of the Name ==
Most early Norfolk Larkmans lived off the land as farm labourers, some died as paupers whilst a few prospered and became yeoman farmers who employed others as labourers.

Gradually Larkmans moved from the countryside to the towns, some to Norwich, the more adventurous to London. John Larkman moved to Hull some time after 1824. Many became craftsmen, some Freemen of Norwich and one a Freeman of the City of London. From about 1860 onwards Larkman families moved further a field to the growing industrial centres - Tyneside, Teesside, Birmingham, Manchester and the Midlands.

A Larkman sailed with Shackleton to the Antarctic. William Larkman, a gardener to Norwich gentry gave his name to a part of Norwich which now has a Larkman Lane, Larkman school and a Larkman Pub (now demolished).

A branch of English Larkmans descend from one Johann Lochmann z Gamsenfels, (aka Lachmann von Gamsenfels) who was born in Prague, Czechoslovakia. He came to London around 1880 to escape the Franco-Prussian wars. He settled and married an English girl. His son, Hermann John Lachman von Gamsenfels, changed his name by deed poll, in or around 1900, to John Larkman. Donald Ewart Larkman, who is listed below as having died in World War 2, in the Netherlands, on 17 November 1940, (he was listed as MIA on 16 November, actual death was 17) is descended from this branch of the Larkmans.

There is a street in Mombasa, Kenya named after Neil and Patty Larkman called Larkers Road.

== Name Meaning ==
The Oxford dictionary of surnames gives the definition below.

- Servant of Lark. Where Lark is from a medieval given name, a byform of Lawrence, derived by back-formation from Larkin

With just two exceptions (see note below) all Larkman families in the world can trace their ancestry back to the county of Norfolk in eastern England. From the early 15th up to the 18th century, bar two sightings in London, no Larkman is listed outside Norfolk or neighbouring Suffolk. This, along with its rarity, suggests that Larkman is a locative surname i.e. it is derived from a placename.

British Surnames by C W Bardsley (published 1901) suggests that Larkman is derived from Lakenham a small village one mile south of Norwich (now a suburb of Norwich). This theory is supported that the earliest recorded Larkmans are to be found in this area and that the surname de Lakenham appears in deeds and apprentice records in the early 14th century. It does not appear in later records.

== Larkmans Who Died In World War One ==
Name	Rank	Regiment	Date of death
Larkman, A W	Seaman	Royal Naval Reserve	1 June 1916
Larkman, C	Rifleman	Royal Rifle Corps	6 April 1918
Larkman, F H A	Private	Australian Infantry, A.I.F	27 September 1917
Larkman, J	Lance Sergeant	King's Royal Rifle Corps	21 April 1916
Larkman, J	Private	East Surrey Regiment	10 May 1915
Larkman, J	Gunner	Royal Garrison Artillery	6 July 1918
Larkman, J C	Private	The Buffs (East Kent Regiment)	27 July 1918
Larkman, R	Private	Durham Light Infantry	15 May 1915
Larkman, W	Private	East Yorkshire Regiment	16 September 1918
Larkman, W A	Rifleman	Kings Royal Rifle Corps	15 September 1914

== Larkmans Who Died In World War Two ==
Name	Rank	Regiment	Date of death
Larkman, A J	Able Seaman	Royal Navy	26 September 1943
Larkman, D E	Sergeant	Royal Air Force Volunteer Reserve	16 November 1940
Larkman, F E	Flying Officer	Royal Canadian Air Force	3 March 1945
Larkman, J W	Stoker 1st Class	Royal Navy	27 July 1943
Larkman, S	Leading Aircraftman	Royal Air Force Volunteer Reserve	28 June 1943
Larkman, W	Lieutenant	Royal Northumberland Fusiliers	17 October 1942
