= Vignoles Bridge =

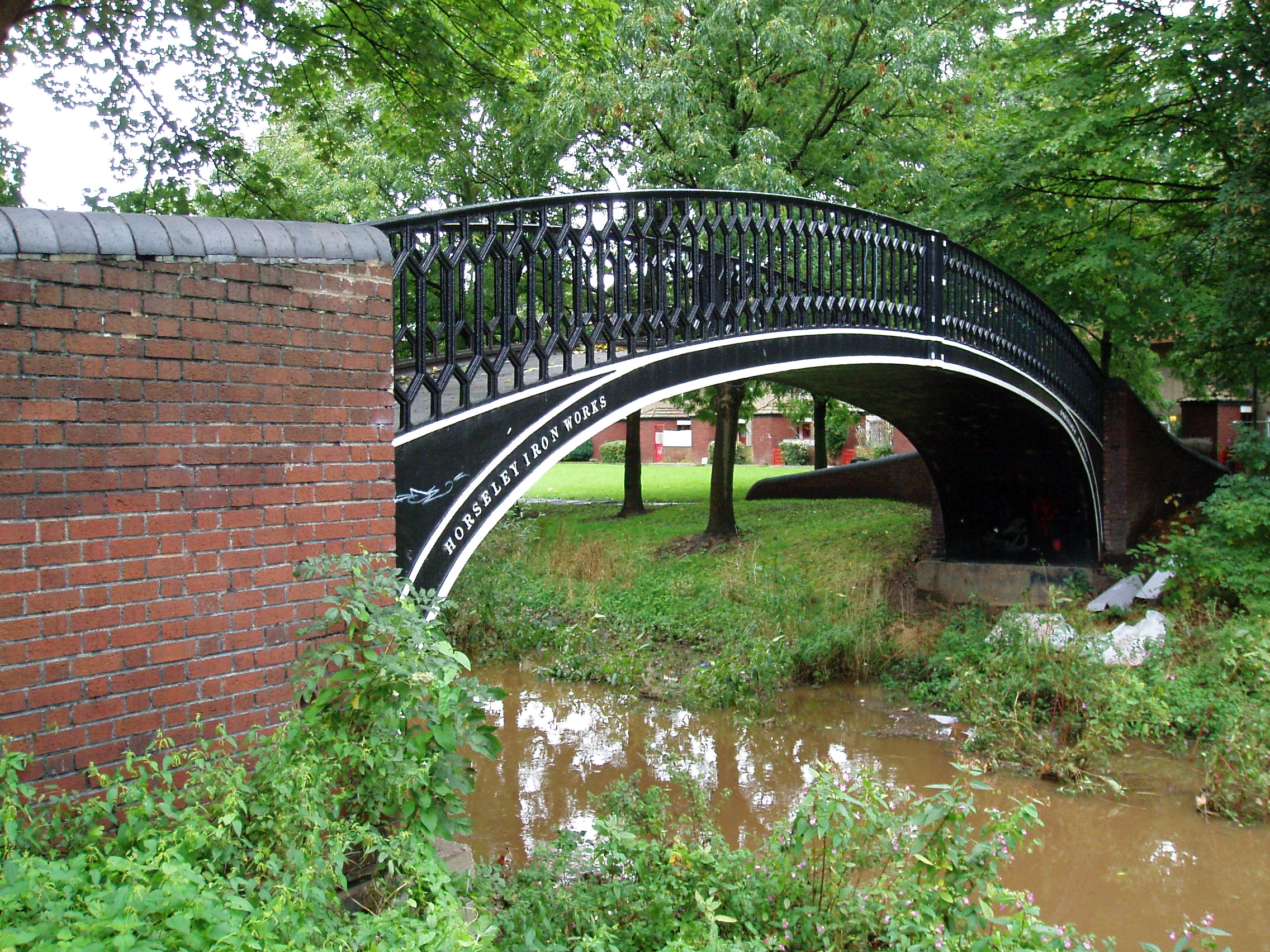
- Vignoles Bridge
- Coordinates: 52.40659°N 1.52077°W
- Carries: Pedestrian traffic
- Crosses: River Sherbourne
- Locale: Spon End, Coventry, England

Characteristics
- Design: cast iron arch bridge

History
- Opened: 1835 (moved 1969)

Vignoles Bridge is a footbridge over the River Sherbourne in Spon End, a western suburb of Coventry in central England. It stands just west of the inner ring road in the middle of a housing estate, to where it was relocated in 1969. It was built in 1835 and originally spanned the Oxford Canal. The bridge is a single-span cast-iron arch and is a scheduled monument.

== Description ==
Vignoles Bridge is a single-span cast iron elliptical arch. Elliptical arches became popular in Britain in the second half of the 18th century because they allow for greater headroom at the ends. They thus became popular on canals, which have a towpath to the side, because they could be built with room for a horse to walk underneath. Many cast-iron bridges in this style were built and became common on canals around Birmingham and the wider West Midlands. The walkway is covered with tarmac and has cast-iron balustrades with geometric piercings in the metalwork either side. The abutments are in red brick with their own parapet; these splay outwards at the landward ends.

The bridge spans the River Sherbourne in the middle of a housing estate in the Spon End area, just west of Coventry city centre and just outside the inner ring road. The river flows through the city centre in a culvert, which it enters just beyond the bridge.

== History ==
Thomas Telford developed the first techniques for maximising the potential of cast iron as a construction material, realising that the lighter frames could use flatter angles and less substantial foundations than timber bridges while preserving the single span, and thus the navigability of the waterways they cross. Historic England, which is responsible for scheduling ancient monuments in England, considers all examples of iron bridges which retain significant original fabric to be of importance. Vignoles Bridge is of particular interest because it "survives well and retains its original features thus demonstrating its engineering design and reflecting the manufacturing process", despite having been moved from its original site.

The bridge originally occupied a site on the Oxford Canal (which runs from Coventry to Oxford) near Sowe Common to the north east of the city centre. The bridge was designed by the engineer Charles Blacker Vignoles and cast at Horseley Iron Works in 1835. Hundreds of canal bridges were cast at the same works. The bridge is known locally as Vignoles Bridge, after its designer. It was moved to its current site in 1969 when it was displaced by construction of the M6 motorway. It is described in a history of civil engineering as "a good example of the preservation of a structure by re-use on another site".

== See also ==
- Scheduled monuments in Coventry
