= Spon Bridge =

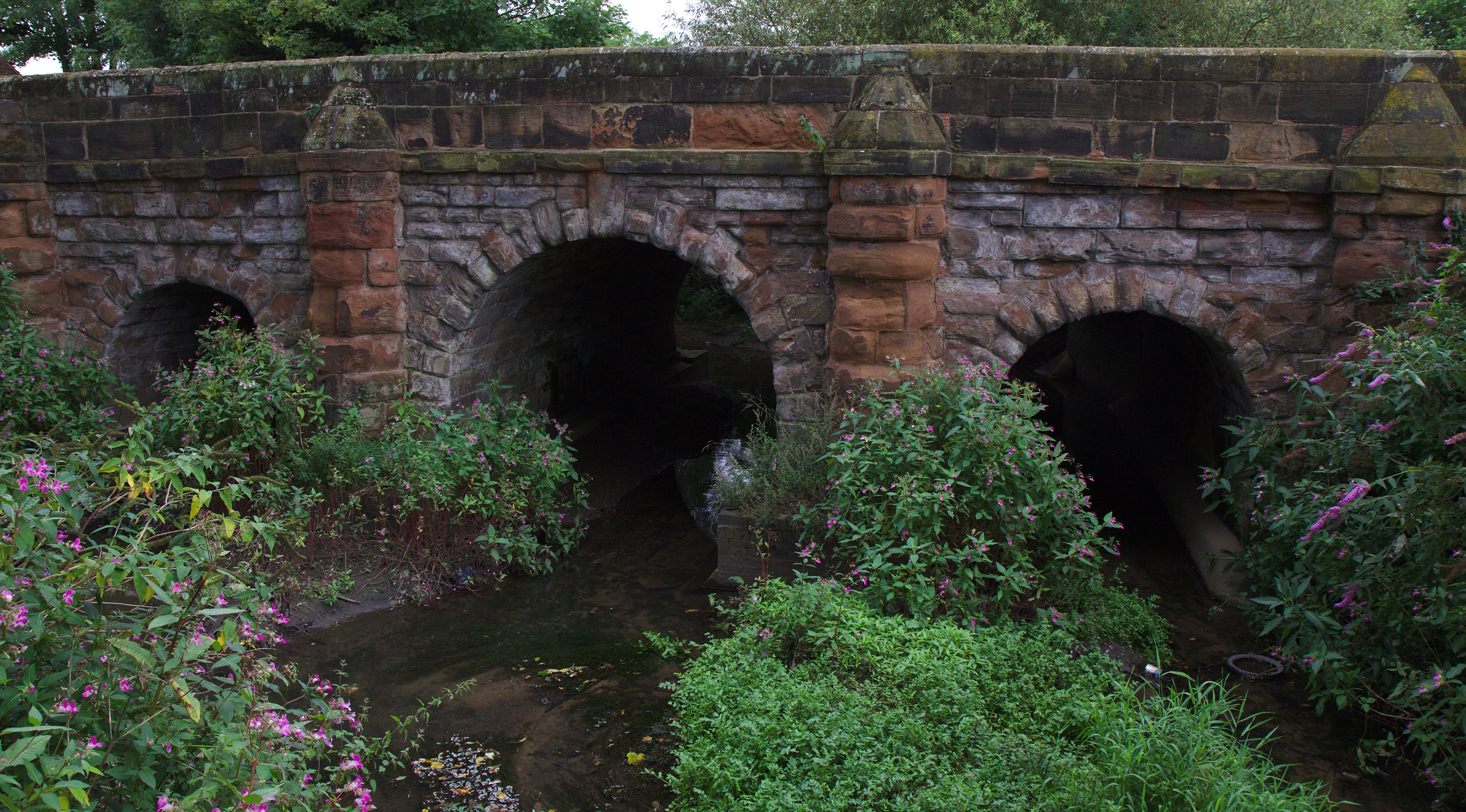
- Coordinates: 52°24′29″N 1°31′30″W
- Carries: Spon Street
- Crosses: River Sherbourne
- Locale: Spon End, Coventry, England
- Heritage status: Grade II listed building

Characteristics
- Material: Sandstone
- No. of spans: 3

History
- Opened: 13th century

Spon Bridge is a bridge carrying Spon Street across the River Sherbourne in Coventry, central England.

== Description and history ==
Spon Street is one of the oldest remaining streets in the centre of Coventry and the site of many historic buildings, some of which were relocated there from elsewhere in the city during post-war redevelopment. The bridge consists of three stone arches. It is known to have been standing since the 13th century but was heavily rebuilt in 1771. Some of the stone for the bridge is believed to have come from Spon Gate, part of Coventry's historic city walls, which was among several of the city gates demolished in the late 18th century because they were impeding trade in and out of the city centre as the city grew. Other rumours suggest that the bridge contains stonework from Coventry's market cross.

In the middle ages, Spon Street was part of the main east-west route through Coventry and the suburb of Spon, which grew up immediately west of the city walls. Spon's boundaries were marked by Spon Gate in the east and Spon Bridge in the west, beyond which was a leper colony, later a hospital with a chapel. Spon Bridge was one of three medieval bridges carrying the route over the River Sherbourne. The surrounding area was a wooded valley in the 12th century. There are records of the bridge being surrounded by houses by 1411.

Edwyn Jervoise, in The Ancient Bridges of Wales & Western England notes a three-arch stone bridge over the Sherbourne. The bridge is built from sandstone and consists of five bays, flanked by plain columns. has been a grade II listed building since 1955. It forms a group with the various other listed buildings on Spon Street.
