= Coventry ring road =

Road in England

A4053
- Coventry ring road
- Coventry ring road highlighted in red
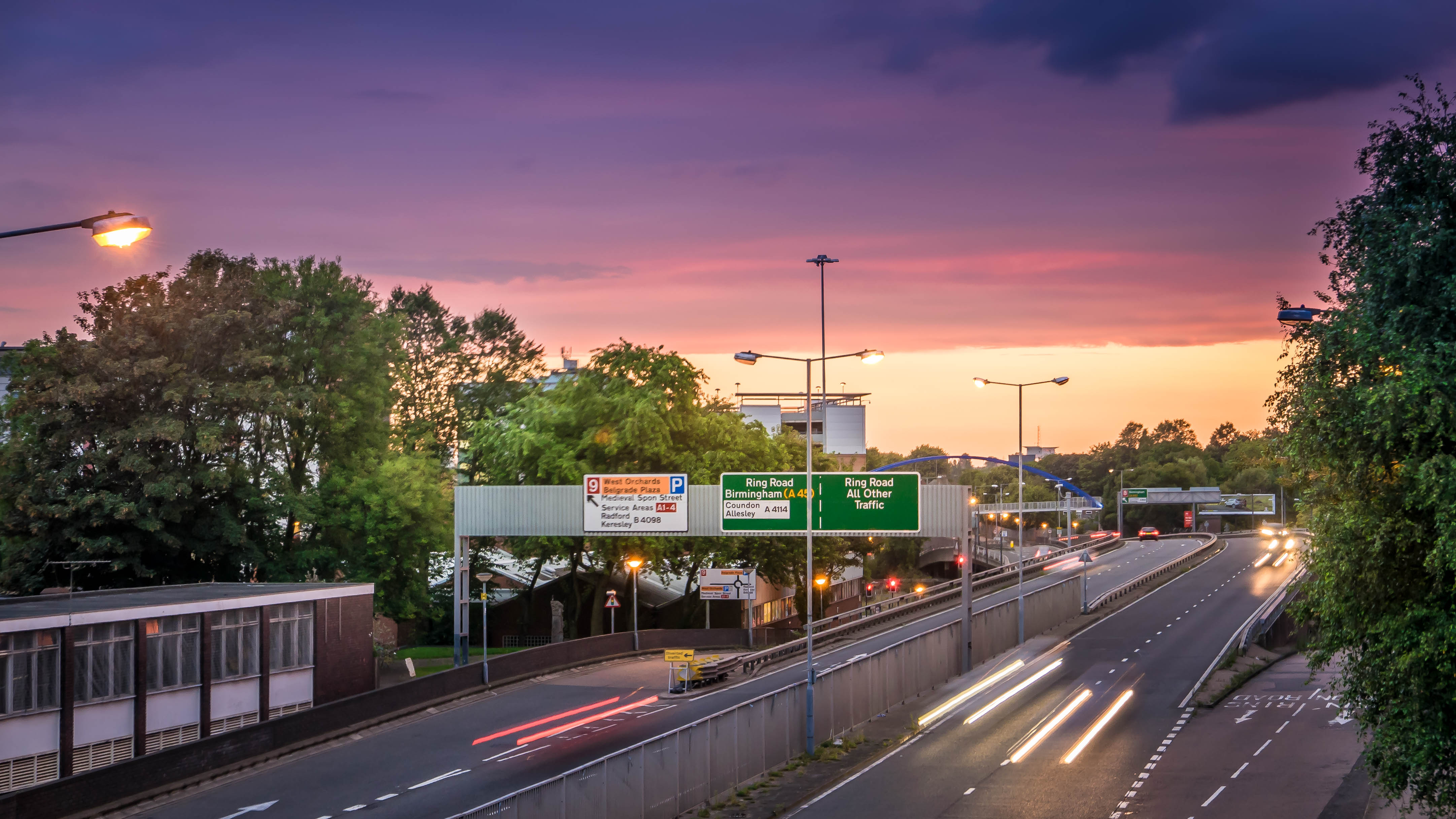
- Junction 9 and Hill Cross flyover, looking anti-clockwise

Route information
- Length: 2.25 mi (3.62 km)
- History: Constructed 1959–1974

Major junctions
- Orbital around Coventry
- Anti-clockwise end: M6 & Coventry Building Society Arena
- A4114; A429; A4600; A4114
- Clockwise end: Hill Cross flyover, Tamworth & Belgrade Theatre

Location
- Country: United Kingdom
- Constituent country: England

Road network
- Roads in the United Kingdom; Motorways; A and B road zones
← A4051	→ A4054

The Coventry ring road, designated as the A4053, is a 2.25-mile (3.62 km) ring road in Coventry, England, which forms a complete dual-carriageway loop around the city centre. The road encompasses the old and new Coventry Cathedrals, the city's shopping areas and much of Coventry University. With the exception of one roundabout at junction 1, the ring road's nine junctions are grade separated and closely spaced, with weaving sections between them, some as short as 300 feet (90 m), giving the road a reputation for being difficult to navigate. The junctions include connections with three other A-roads: the A4114, A4600 and A429.

From the 1930s, Coventry City Council began replacing the city's narrow medieval streets with modern roads, to cope with a rapidly growing population. City architect Donald Gibson began work in 1939 on a city centre redevelopment plan which expanded in scope following World War II, during which large areas of the city were destroyed by German bombs. The shopping area was rebuilt first, followed by the ring road, which was constructed in six stages from 1959. Early stages were built with at-grade junctions, cycle tracks and footpaths, envisaged as a surface-level linear park. Following traffic surveys in the early 1960s, however, the council amended the design to include grade separation and the weaving sections. Research by the city engineer indicated that it was the first urban road in the world to use this configuration at such a small scale. The road was completed in 1974, with an overall cost of £14.5 million (equivalent to £137,500,000 in 2025).

As one of the few British cities to see its ring road project to completion, Coventry has received attention as a source of research for post-war architecture. An article by BBC News noted that opinions about the road were varied, concluding that "you either love it or you hate it". The road was the subject of a 2015 series of poetry films and driving on it has been likened to driving a Scalextric car and riding on a roller coaster.

== Route description ==
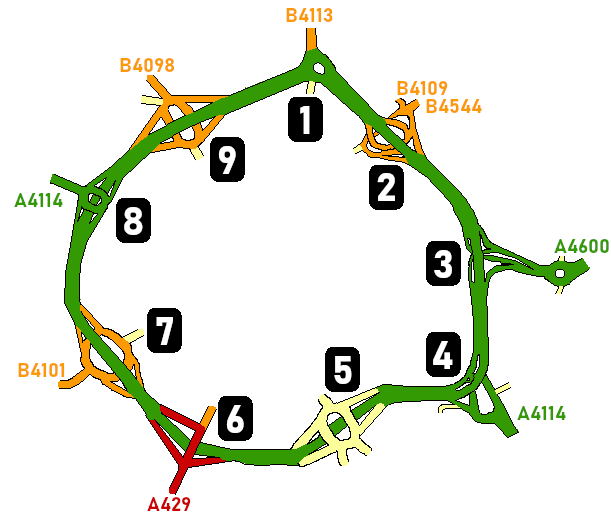
Map of Coventry ring road showing the junction numbers and connecting roads

The ring road forms a complete dual-carriageway loop around the city centre of Coventry, with the designation A4053 in the Great Britain road numbering scheme. It is 2.25 miles (3.62 km) in length and is a primary route throughout. The road encloses an area containing the old and new Coventry Cathedrals, much of Coventry University, shopping areas such as the Upper Precinct, Lower Precinct, West Orchards and Cathedral Lanes, the medieval Spon Street and the Coventry Skydome.

Being a complete ring road, it does not have unique start or end points. Junction 1, the road's only at-grade junction and its northernmost point, is a roundabout with four exits: the eastbound and westbound ring roads, the B4113 Foleshill Road to the north and Tower Street to the south. Proceeding east (clockwise), junction 2 is a grade separated junction with Hales Street, White Street and Bird Street and the closest to Pool Meadow Bus Station. Between junctions 2 and 4, the carriageway rises to become an elevated highway called the Swanswell viaduct. Junction 3 is the easternmost on the circuit, providing access to the A4600 Sky Blue Way, which is the former route of the A46 and the signed route from Coventry to Leicester via the M69, as well as linking to the M6. Junction 3 also serves the A428 to Rugby and the A444 to Nuneaton, via a pair of junctions half a mile (0.8 kilometres) to the east.

Continuing clockwise, the road runs due south to junction 4 with the A4114 London Road. This road links to the A46 southbound towards the M40 motorway, and also to the A45 eastbound, taking traffic to the M45 and M1 motorways towards London. The main lanes of the anticlockwise carriageway at junction 4 lead to the exit, meaning traffic staying on the ring road must move to the left, and then back to the right to avoid the junction 3 exit.

Junction 5 provides access to the south-eastern part of the city centre, via the B4544 New Union Street, and also links to a pair of roads heading south towards the suburb of Cheylesmore. Junction 6, the southernmost junction, links to the A429 Warwick Road, signposted for Kenilworth, and is also the exit for the War Memorial Park, the University of Warwick and Coventry railway station, which lies just outside the ring road loop. From junction 6, the clockwise carriageway proceeds north west. Junction 7 is the B4101 Butts Road radial, linking to the suburb of Earlsdon, the ring road passing over on the Moat Street flyover, while it passes under junction 8 for the A4114 Holyhead Road towards Birmingham, formerly the A45 westbound. The road then runs north east through junction 9 for the B4098 Radford Road radial, which it passes over on the Hill Cross flyover, before arriving back at the junction 1 roundabout.

== History ==
=== Background ===
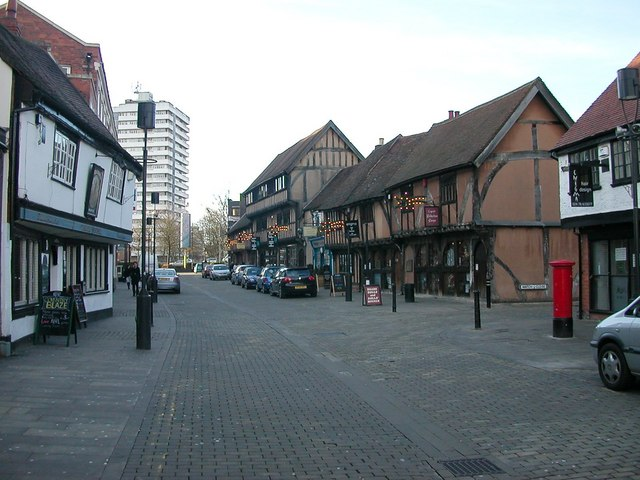
Spon Street, one of Coventry's medieval roads

The road layout within Coventry and its road links to other settlements were developed during the Middle Ages, becoming stable by the 17th century. During the 19th century, some roads were upgraded to turnpike status, but development was slow due to difficulty in securing funding, and much of the city's road network consisted of narrow medieval streets. An exception was Thomas Telford's road from London to Holyhead, built through Coventry between 1827 and 1830. Telford used advanced engineering techniques for the time with good drainage and stone foundations, and the road became the major route between London and Birmingham, replacing an older route along Spon Street.

In the early 20th century, Coventry was the fastest-growing city in the UK as people relocated from across the country to work in the expanding automotive, bicycle, aviation and armament industries. The city's boundaries expanded in stages, absorbing nearby villages as well as new residential areas. Coventry City Council upgraded the city's radial roads but the city centre retained its medieval character until 1930. By then, the buildings and infrastructure were unable to cope with the needs of the increased population and the council tasked city engineer Ernest Ford with modernising it. During the 1930s, Ford oversaw the construction of Corporation Street and Trinity Street as well as widening other roads. This involved large-scale demolition and relocation of residents to other areas, and created the first sections of inner ring road, on what is now the inner circulatory route. He also created the southern bypass, re-routing the A45 and London to Birmingham traffic around the city. In early 1939, the council appointed Donald Gibson as city architect. A protégé of Patrick Abercrombie at the University of Liverpool School of Architecture, Gibson assembled a team of young architects, with whom he produced plans more radical than Ford's. These were presented to the public at an exhibition in summer 1940 and included a new civic zone north east of the cathedral.

In November 1940 and April 1941, following the outbreak of World War II, the city was attacked by the Luftwaffe in the Coventry Blitz. Large areas, including the cathedral, were left in ruins. Needing to rebuild rapidly, the council instructed Gibson and Ford to work together to agree on a blueprint for the city centre. Shortly after the first bombing, they met Lord Reith, the government minister responsible for rebuilding, who advised them to plan the reconstruction "boldly and comprehensively" even if this meant high costs. The two men did not work well together and they eventually produced two separate plans; Ford's emphasised maintaining as much of the existing architecture as possible while getting businesses running again, while Gibson advocated a comprehensive redesign with a new layout and modern architecture. Gibson's plan included the use of ring roads to divert traffic away from the city centre. The pair presented their competing visions in February 1941, and the council decided to adopt Gibson's.

Gibson developed his plan throughout the war, releasing an updated version in October 1945 at the "Coventry of the Future" exhibition. The council started work on the project in 1946, laying a commemorative stone on the future site of the shopping precinct and beginning the conversion of Broadgate, the city's historic hub, into a green central square. This first phase was opened in 1948 by the future Queen Elizabeth II, with a statue of Lady Godiva (Note: Godiva was a noblewoman who was married to Leofric, Earl of Mercia, who was the Lord of Coventry in the 11th century. According to a local legend, Godiva protested to her husband about the high level of taxation in Coventry at the time. He replied that he would lower the taxes only if Godiva rode naked through the city's streets. The legend says that Godiva agreed to this, and every citizen in the city barred their doors and windows out of respect for her, except for Peeping Tom, who looked at Godiva as she passed and was struck blind. As a result of her actions, Leofric kept his promise to reduce taxes. Godiva remains an important figure in the city, with the city council describing her as "apart from Boudicca ... the most celebrated woman from Dark Ages Britain".) added a year later.

=== Planning the ring road ===
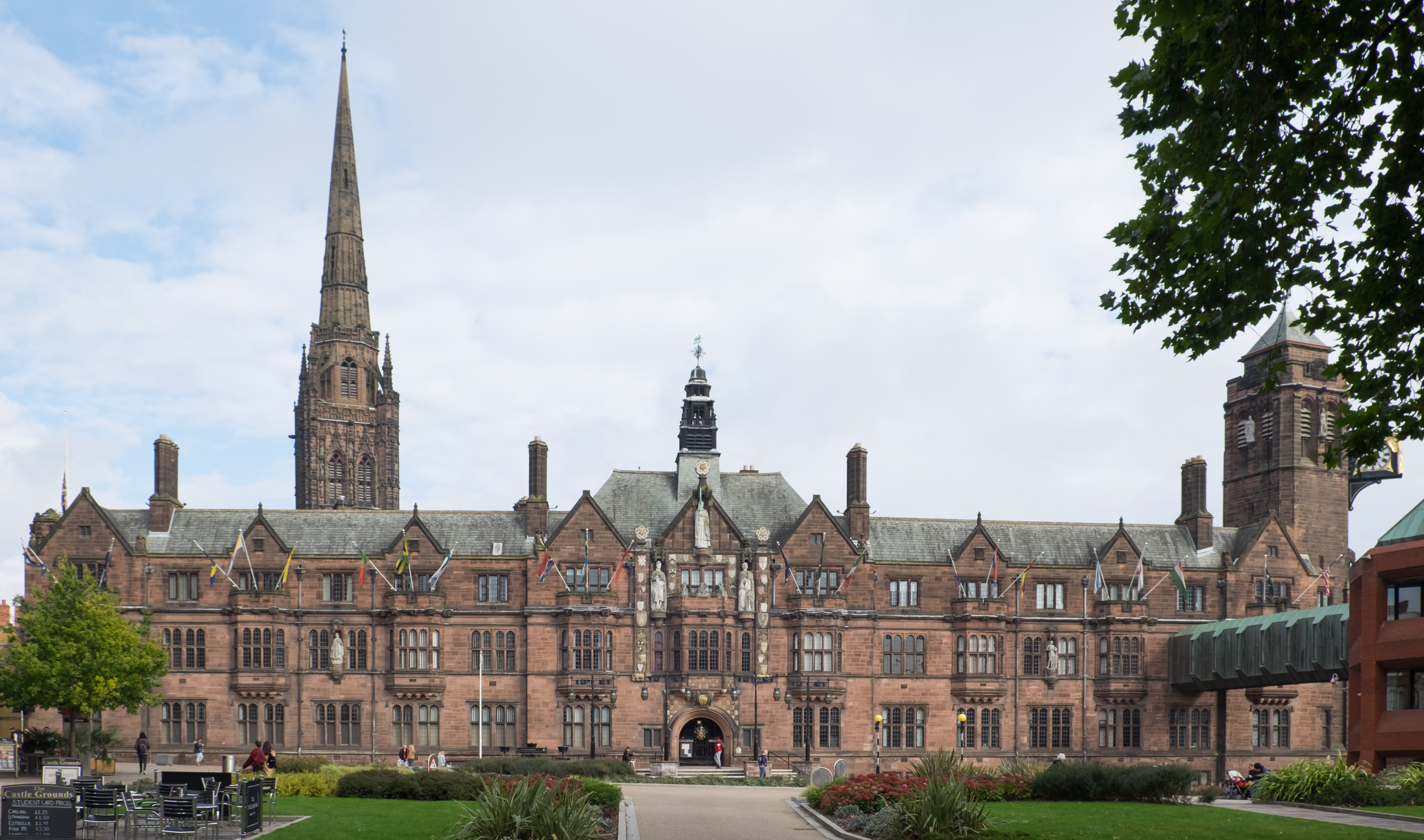
Gibson initially proposed centring the road on a new civic centre east of the Council House.

Gibson's 1941 plan called for "a system of radial and ring roads", the innermost ring centred on a proposed civic centre east of the Council House. His intention was to use existing roads wherever possible, widening them to dual carriageways and linking them to the radial roads with roundabouts. In his 1945 "Coventry of the Future" plan, Gibson moved the proposed route of the ring road to the north and west of the 1941 version, with the new alignment centred on Broadgate. This new route no longer followed Corporation Street and Queen Victoria Road, and Gibson designated the land between these and the ring-road route for light industry. The government did not initially approve the new route, citing a concern that it encircled too much of the city. But the council's position was that the ring road could not run on Corporation Street and Queen Victoria Road as planned, due to the need for businesses to have direct access to those roads, and therefore must be sited further north west. The plan included provision for the inner circulatory route, a loop comprising existing roads inside the ring road, to serve as a distributor within the city centre. The 1945 plan also featured two additional ring roads – a middle ring passing through the suburbs, and an outer ring extending the existing A45 southern bypass.

Gibson and the council made minor changes to the design during the subsequent years including the addition of two new roundabouts, to make a total of nine. The council and the government then agreed the final design in 1948. This retained many of Gibson's early ideas including a dual-carriageway layout, lanes for cyclists and pedestrians on both sides, and at-grade roundabout junctions connecting to all of the major radial routes out of the city. The route was to be 2.25 miles (3.62 km) long and would follow some existing routes, with new alignments for the remainder. Although the plan was agreed and signed off, the council did not begin construction immediately. Funding was limited following the economic hardship of the war, and the council's priority was the rebuilding of bomb-damaged areas in the city centre and completing the precinct, to enable businesses and shops to resume full operation. The city-centre work lasted throughout the first half of the 1950s, as the council and businesses had to negotiate the use of the space and conduct lengthy planning applications, as well as completing the construction work. The ring-road plan remained active and planners ensured that no new structures were situated close to the proposed route, to maintain its availability for road development.

In 1955, with the upper level of the precinct completed, Gibson left Coventry to become county architect for Nottinghamshire. His replacement as Coventry's city architect was Arthur Ling, who had been Senior Planning Officer for the London County Council since 1946. Ling continued Gibson's work in developing the city centre while also reviewing details of the development plan. He updated the proposals to include pedestrianisation of the north–south axis of the precinct, while noting that city centre traffic congestion remained a major issue, which would be worsened by the extended pedestrianisation. The council lobbied the government for permission and funding for the long-delayed ring road. The government had reduced investment expenditure significantly from late 1955, and in 1956 the Ministry of Transport and Civil Aviation (MOT) denied the council permission to build the entire road, indicating that only the south-eastern portion was likely to be approved at that time. Despite this, the council in 1957 approved and submitted a plan for the full route, divided into six stages with a time estimate of six or seven years.

=== Stage one: London Road – Quinton Road ===
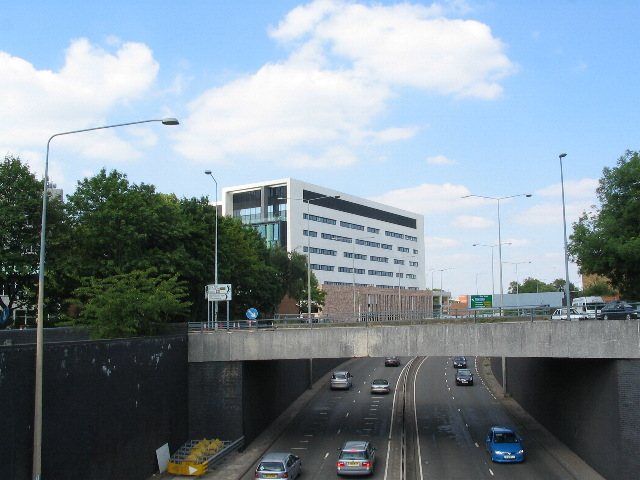
Looking east from junction 5 towards junction 4 in 2010. This was the first section constructed, but it was substantially rebuilt in the 1970s as part of stage six.

The first stage of the ring road built was a 439-yard (401 m) stretch south east of the city centre, from what is now junction 4 at London Road to junction 5 at Quinton Road. This section was intended to relieve nearby Parkside, Short Street and Much Park Street, which were heavily congested with traffic entering Coventry from London Road. The design was based on Gibson's 1940s plan, which included cycle tracks and footpaths on both sides, and envisaged it as a surface-level "linear park". The carriageways in stages one and two were 24 feet (7.3 m) wide, while the adjacent cycle tracks had a width of 12 feet (3.7 m) and the pedestrian pavements 8 feet (2.4 m). The MOT approved stage one in December 1957, pledging 75 per cent of the estimated £310,000 cost (equivalent to £6,500,000 in 2025) for the stage. The MOT justified the grant, which was higher than was normal for the central government at the time, by citing Coventry's status as a "blitz city".

After receiving MOT approval, the council began negotiations with businesses and homeowners along the proposed route, to purchase their properties for demolition. Compulsory purchase orders were issued in June 1958, and by the end of the year most of the affected properties were empty and awaiting demolition. The council also announced the closure of parts of Parkside, St Patrick's Road and Quinton Road for the duration of the project. By April 1959, demolition of unoccupied properties was underway and the council served eviction orders on the remaining properties on the route. This included five pubs and several houses and shops. Some features of the demolished areas were retained in the new road, for example stone setts from St John's Street, which were relaid as the divide between the cycle tracks and pavements.

On 1 July 1959, with the demolition work almost complete, construction on the Coventry ring road began. Pirelli General Cable Works contractors laid nine long tons (9,100 kg) of power cable underneath the roadways, after which the route was levelled in preparation for the laying of foundations, which began in mid-August. The foundation consisted of at least 6 inches (150 mm) of crushed stone, with 4 inches (100 mm) of lean concrete above it, topped with 8-inch (200 mm) thick concrete slabs. The surface was tarmac, which contractors began laying in early September. With one carriageway fully tarmacked by late November, the council considered opening that side early, around 8 December, but ultimately they decided to open both carriageways together.

By December 1959, the contractors were in the final stages of construction. Several roads at the end of the stretch were closed temporarily to allow it to be joined to the existing road network. Sodium lights, mounted on 35-foot (11 m) poles, were installed between the carriageways. Stage one was opened on 23 December 1959, Lord Mayor William Henry Edwards cutting a ribbon before being driven along the road in his civic car. There were traffic lights at each end at the time of opening, although stage two work on the London Road roundabout at stage one's eastern end commenced shortly afterwards.

=== Stage two: Bishop Street – Hill Street, and London Road roundabout ===
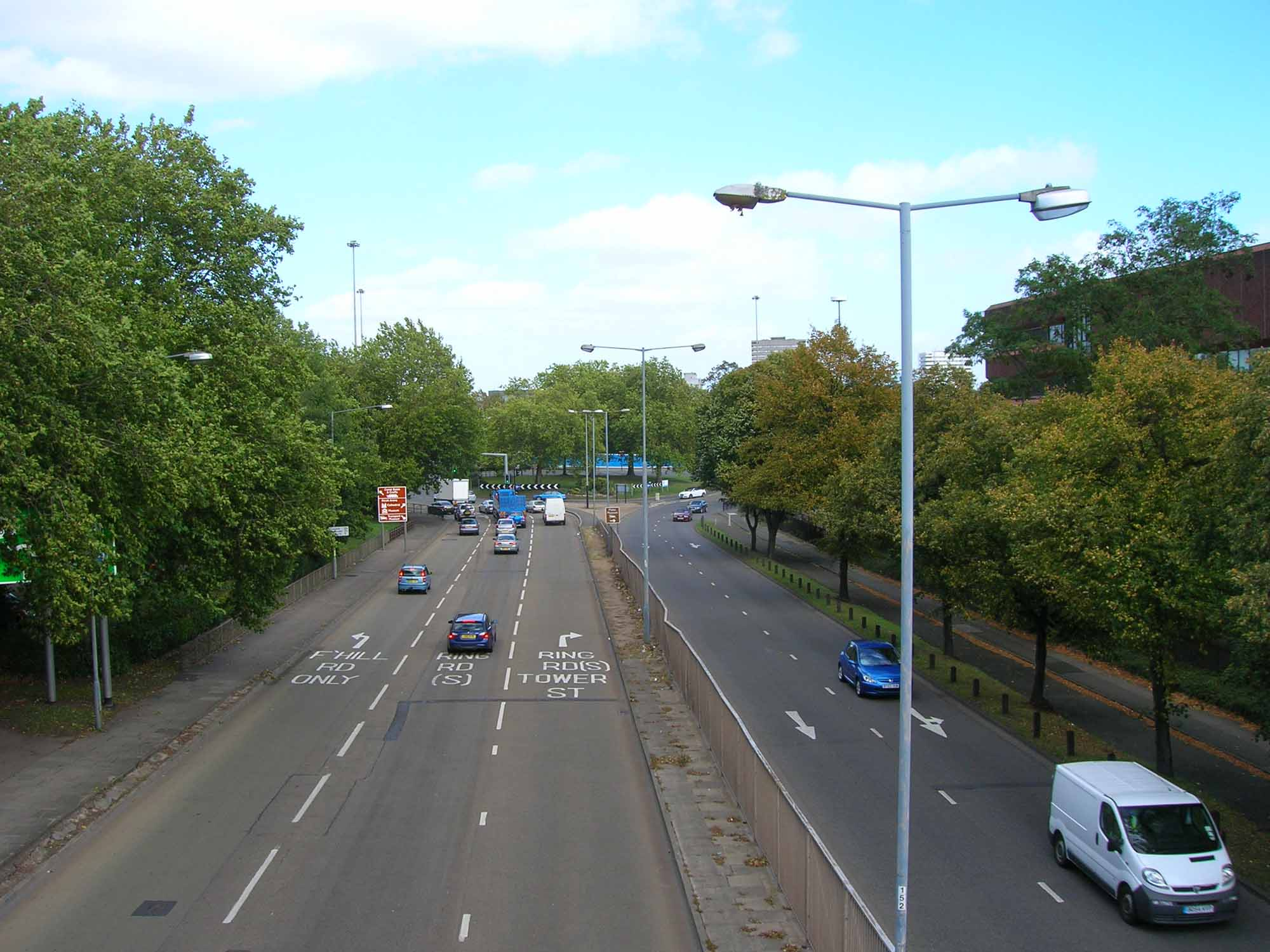
Stage two is the earliest section of the ring road still in use unaltered.

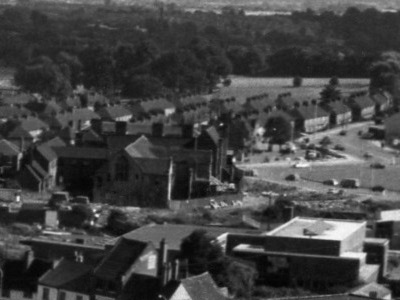
The original London Road roundabout, viewed in 1967

Stage two consisted of two separate projects – a roundabout at the eastern end of stage one and a new stretch of road to the north west of the city centre. The government approved stage two on 28 November 1958, providing a grant of £232,000 (equivalent to £4,700,000 in 2025) towards total costs of £310,000 (equivalent to £6,300,000 in 2025). The new road began at Hill Cross and ran roughly along the line of King Street to Swanswell Terrace, a total distance of 480 yards (440 m). Like stage one, the stage featured cycle paths and pedestrian pavements on both sides, as well as a junction with Bishop Street. The cost eventually grew to £535,445 (equivalent to £10,700,000 in 2025), including compensation to landowners.

After compulsory purchase orders were issued and all objections resolved, demolition of properties had begun by March 1960, including the Canal Offices building and properties on King Street. A 29-foot (8.8 m) section of Coventry's ancient city wall and a square watchtower were discovered during the excavation, dating to between 1350 and 1400. The wall section had been incorporated into the cellar wall of an 18th-century property on King Street, which was among those demolished. A team of archaeologists led by Charmian Woodfield worked on the site for the next year, discovering a medieval cesspit containing 15th century pottery and a trench outside the wall which was built for additional protection. As of 2022, the watchtower and a short section of the wall surrounding it remain in place. Demolition was slow, due to issues with relocating residents as well as squatters, and was still ongoing at the end of 1960.

By June 1961, excavation was underway at the northern end of Bishop Street to process piping and electrical services. The foundations were laid from July 1961, starting with the southern side of the road, and work on the roadway had begun by early August. Engineers began tarmacking the southbound stretch from Swanswell Terrace to Hill Cross during the week of 14 August, opening it to traffic on 22 August, with the northbound carriageway following on 8 November. At the time of opening, the road had at-grade temporary junctions with Bishop Street and the old Radford Road (now Leicester Row), as the new radials linking those roads to the ring road were not yet complete. Unlike stage one, stage two had no opening ceremony – the road opened when construction workers moved barriers away from the access roads and traffic began to use it immediately.

Stage two also included the separate roundabout project at the eastern end of the stretch constructed in stage one, at the junction with London Road, Gulson Road, Whitefriars Street and Paradise Street. To facilitate the construction of the roundabout, the council issued compulsory purchase orders on buildings owned by various shops and businesses close to the site. Two of these businesses, a petrol station and a scrap metal merchant, objected to the purchase and an inquiry was held. The council argued that the petrol station was too close to the road and that it would be difficult to secure access routes from the new layout. The Minister of Transport upheld the landowners' appeal, agreeing with them that much of the land was not required for the road. The plans therefore had to be altered. Construction of the roundabout necessitated the destruction of most houses in Paradise Street, and its residents moved out in early 1960. It opened to traffic in December 1960, with peripheral work and finishing continuing for a further few months.

=== Traffic surveys and redesign ===
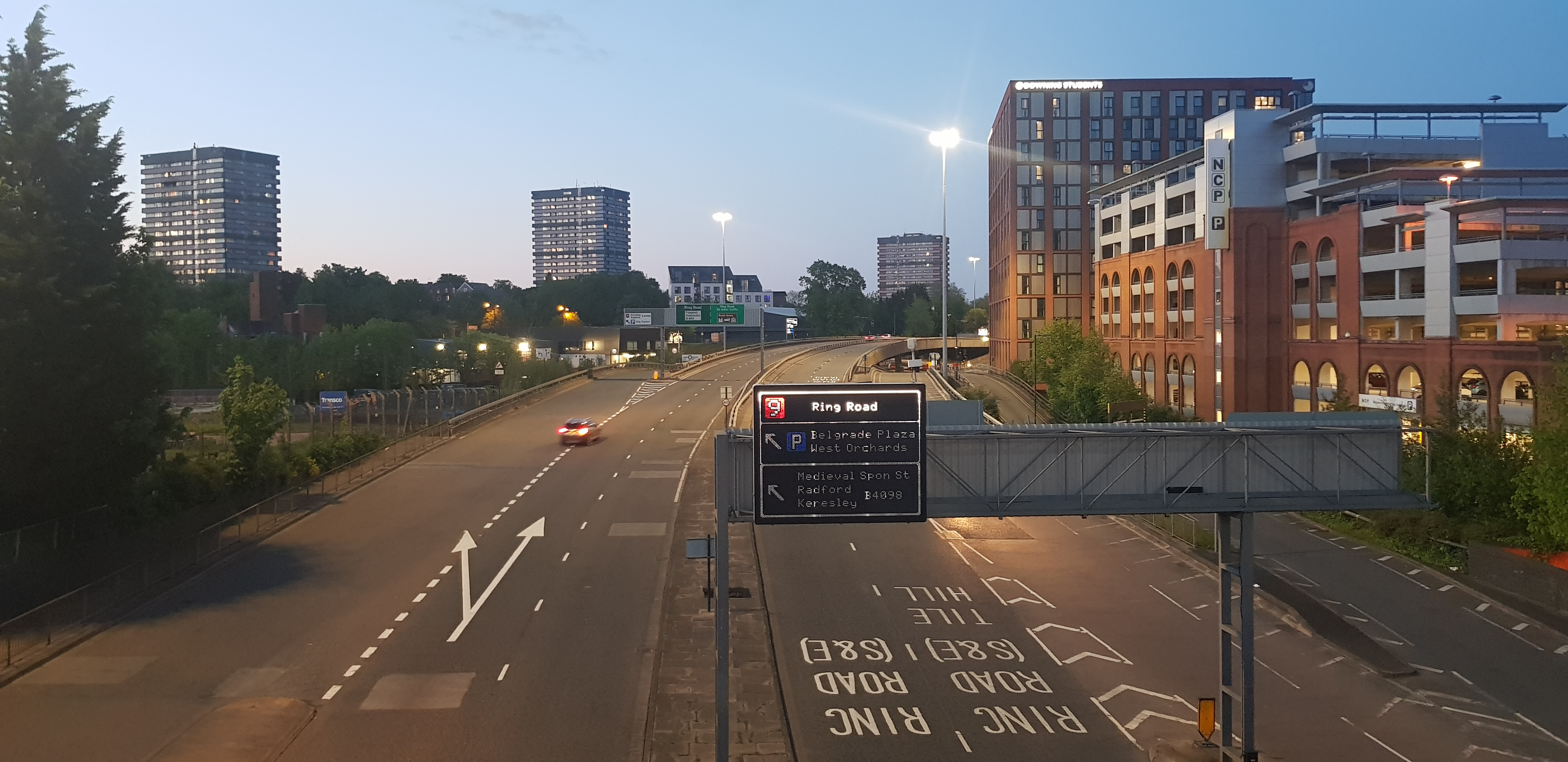
Weaving lane (left), for joining the clockwise ring road at junction 8 as well as leaving it at junction 9

By 1960, despite stage one being open and stage two underway, the council realised that it needed a better understanding of Coventry's long-term traffic requirements. There was little vehicle-movement data recorded at the time, and theory for large-scale car use in cities was not well developed. The council therefore carried out a survey to establish traffic patterns. Interviewers were stationed close to the planned line of the ring road, where they asked drivers their origin and destination. The results of the survey were published in late 1960, predicting a 150 per cent increase in light traffic and a 75 per cent increase in heavy traffic during the subsequent twenty years. The city engineer decided that the plans as they stood would be insufficient to cater for this growth. In particular, the placing of nine roundabouts on the road was predicted to lead to considerable congestion. To remedy this, the council investigated the use of grade-separated junctions to replace the planned surface roundabouts. The use of such junctions had not at the time been tested at the scale required in Coventry, either in Europe or the United States. But the Road Research Laboratory, at the time a UK government agency, had produced a formula for safe traffic weaving distances between such junctions. Using this, the city engineer concluded that the ring road's layout could cope with grade separation, and recommended its use going forward.

In 1961, the council began a thorough review of its road transport policy. The city's planning department had begun to question the entire ring-road concept, arguing that it was not the most effective way to reduce congestion and created a damaging divide between urban communities and the city centre. A fresh traffic study was launched, producing a development plan for the transport needs of the whole city, which continued for much of the next ten years and produced several large volumes of results. The council determined early in the study that it would proceed with the ring road, but remodelled to include grade separation. The road's character was to be quite different from that of Gibson's design, with the cycle paths removed to make way for wider lanes and slip roads, and the "linear park" concept replaced with a largely elevated motorway-type road. After completion of the ring road, the development plan's long-term goals included construction of a Y-shaped pair of high-capacity "urban motor roads" in the suburbs, catering for traffic growth through to the 1980s. One of these roads was to be aligned north–south and the other east–west, providing uninterrupted dual-carriageway links between the ring road, the A45 and A46 roads in the south and the M6 motorway in the north.

=== Stage three: Moat Street flyover and Butts radial ===
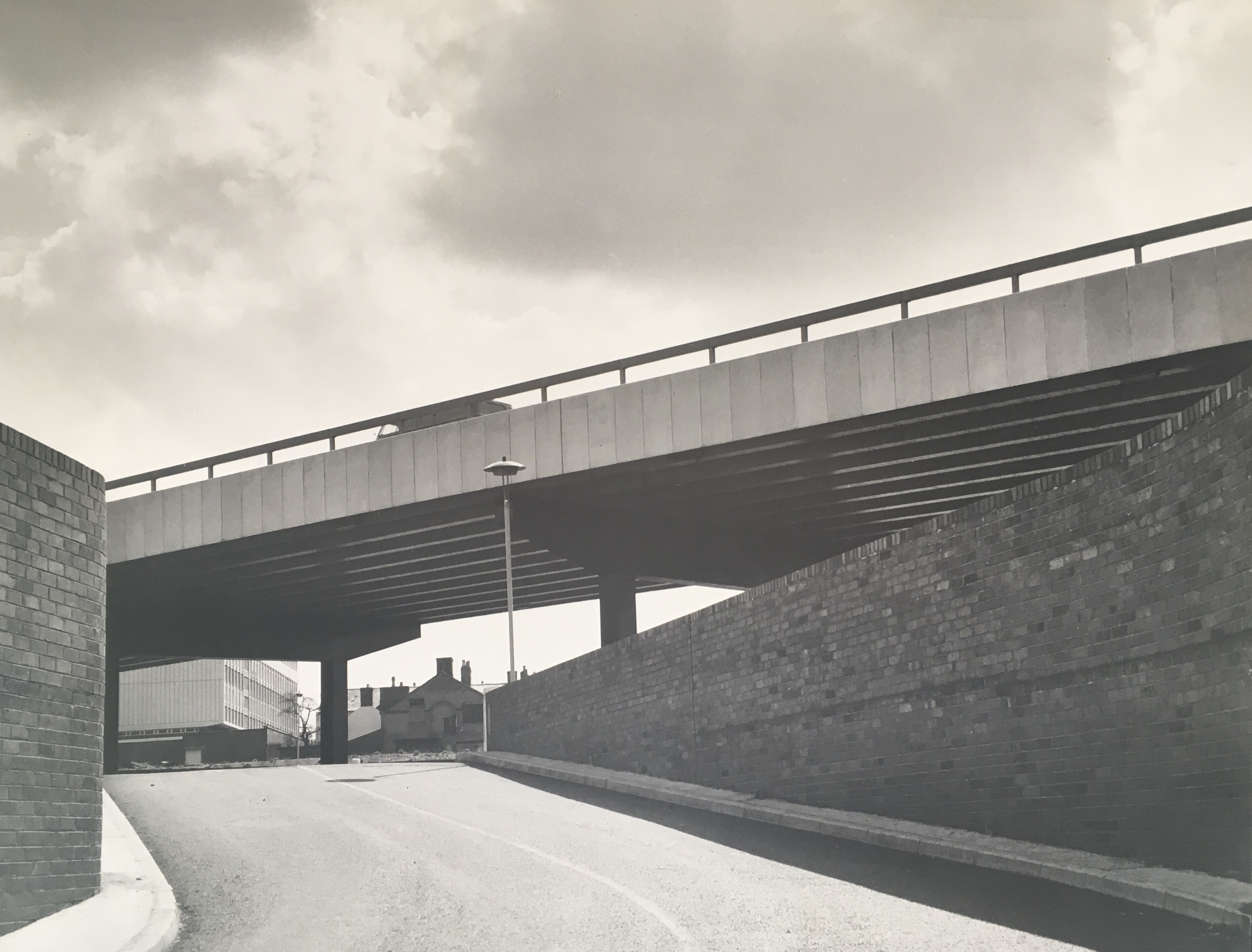
Moat Street flyover in 1966

The third stage to be built, and the first with grade separation, was the section on the western side of the city centre, between Holyhead Road in the north and Queen's Road in the south. The route was previously occupied by low-cost housing and small factories. This completed junction 7, with the road passing over the junction on a 1,000-foot (300 m) overpass known as the Moat Street flyover. It also divided Spon Street into two disconnected sections. The flyover was built using steel girders, a technique not commonly used for bridges at the time, the project benefiting from an ongoing downturn in the construction steel industry which enabled it to source material more cheaply.

Compulsory purchase orders were made in August 1961, with demolition beginning in September 1962 and preparatory work for the flyover commencing by November. Construction was carried out by several companies: Dorman, Long and Co. erected the steel supports for the flyover and McKinney Foundations the piling, with the main carriageway work carried out initially by local firm G. R. Yeomans. But in December 1963 the City Engineer, Granville Berry, ended Yeomans' contract, citing a lack of progress, poor workmanship and the company's financial health as reasons. Galliford & Sons took over to complete the remainder of the work.

The Moat Street flyover was completed in November 1964, and it had been anticipated that it would open at that time. But with the Butts radial road not yet complete the council decided to defer this, citing potential driver confusion at the southern end if complex temporary measures were put in place. Traffic was routed between Queen's Road and Spon Street via the new road's slip roads for a few months and in May 1965 the flyover opened to traffic, connecting the same two roads. A car park in the centre of the junction's roundabout was in use by August 1965, serving employees of the General Electric Company's plant in Spon Street.

Along with stage three, the city also constructed two link roads to the new Moat Street junction. The first was the Butts radial road, for which construction began in July 1965. This was built by Turriff Construction of Warwick, and its purpose was to provide access to the ring road from Coventry's south-western suburbs. It ran from the Moat Street junction to The Butts, joining the existing road network close to the then Coventry Technical College. It was completed and opened in late May 1966, with a pair of subways under the radial and the Moat Street roundabout allowing pedestrian access to the city centre. The second new road was Croft Street on the city side of the roundabout, which opened in July 1965 and, as of 2022, carries traffic through to the inner-circulatory route at Queen Victoria Road.

=== Stage four: Hill Cross – Holyhead Road ===
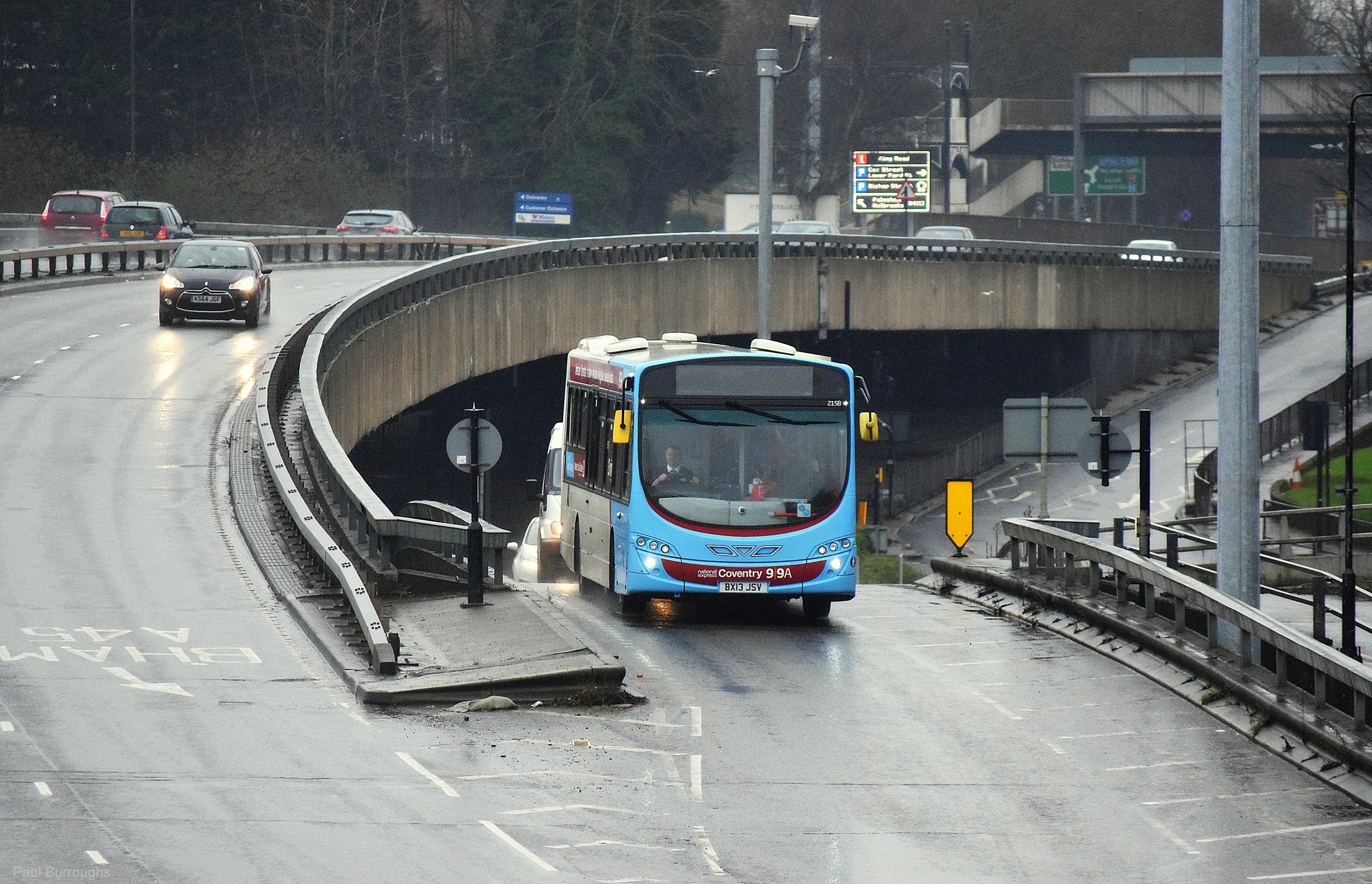
Hill Cross flyover at junction 9, which was constructed in stage four

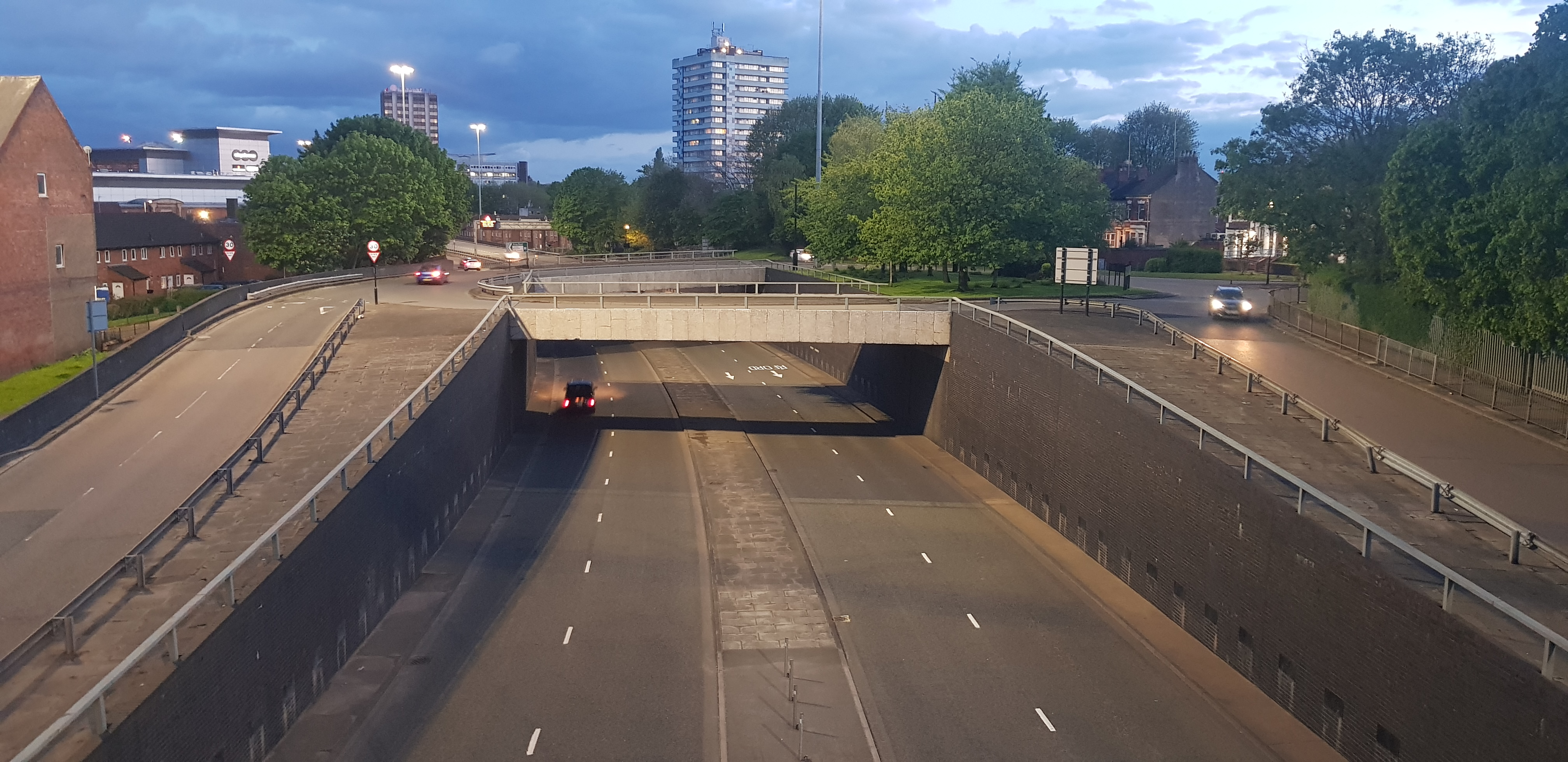
Junction 8 of the ringroad, with the Holyhead Road

The fourth stage of the project was the missing link joining stage two to stage three and included completion of junctions 8 and 9. Work on this stage was closely aligned with that on stage three as the two connected with each other at Holyhead Road and stage four preparation and building began before much of the prior stage was opened. The council selected the principal stage three contractor, Galliford, as the primary contractor for stage four, including the Radford radial, while McKinney and Dorman Long once again performed the piling and the steelwork respectively. PSC Equipment were also involved for post-tensioning work on the concrete. The council had originally intended to make an advance order for the steel required for stage four in 1962, following the successful and economical work done on stage three. But the government vetoed this plan, and by 1964 when the Hill Cross materials were ordered, the steel market had recovered and costs were significantly higher.

Compulsory purchase orders were made in 1963, and were approved by the ministry. Preparatory work, including rerouting of sewers under Hill Street, and temporary diversions began in October 1964. The link between the two sections of Holyhead Road was severed permanently from the beginning of 1965 with slip roads from Spon Street to Holyhead Road, to allow work to begin on junction 8. Holyhead Road was left as a dead end on the city-centre side, causing loss of trade for businesses on that section. Dorman Long began erecting the steel girders in May 1965, transporting them from their Middlesbrough factory by train. Work on the roundabout underneath the junction, slip roads and the Radford radial also began around the same time. By November, all steelwork was in place for the flyover, and it was ready for the concrete surface to be laid.

The Radford radial was completed first and opened to traffic in February 1966, linking the ring road to Radford Road. The section of the old Radford Road on the city side was cut off from the rest and left as a dead end. The slip roads were brought into use in early June, allowing traffic to travel between the junctions but not yet on the flyover or the underpass. This opened up a through route from junction 6 in the south all the way through to junction 1 in the north, via the Moat Street flyover and the stage four slip roads, allowing traffic to bypass the city centre for the first time. The Hill Cross flyover and Holyhead Road underpasses were both opened on 18 July 1966, three months ahead of schedule, with construction workers removing the barriers and allowing traffic to flow.

=== Stage five: Foleshill Road – London Road ===
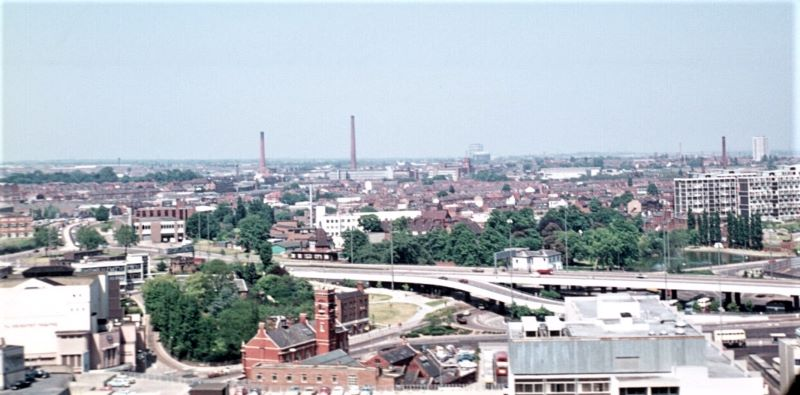
The ring road at junction 2, five years after the opening of stage five

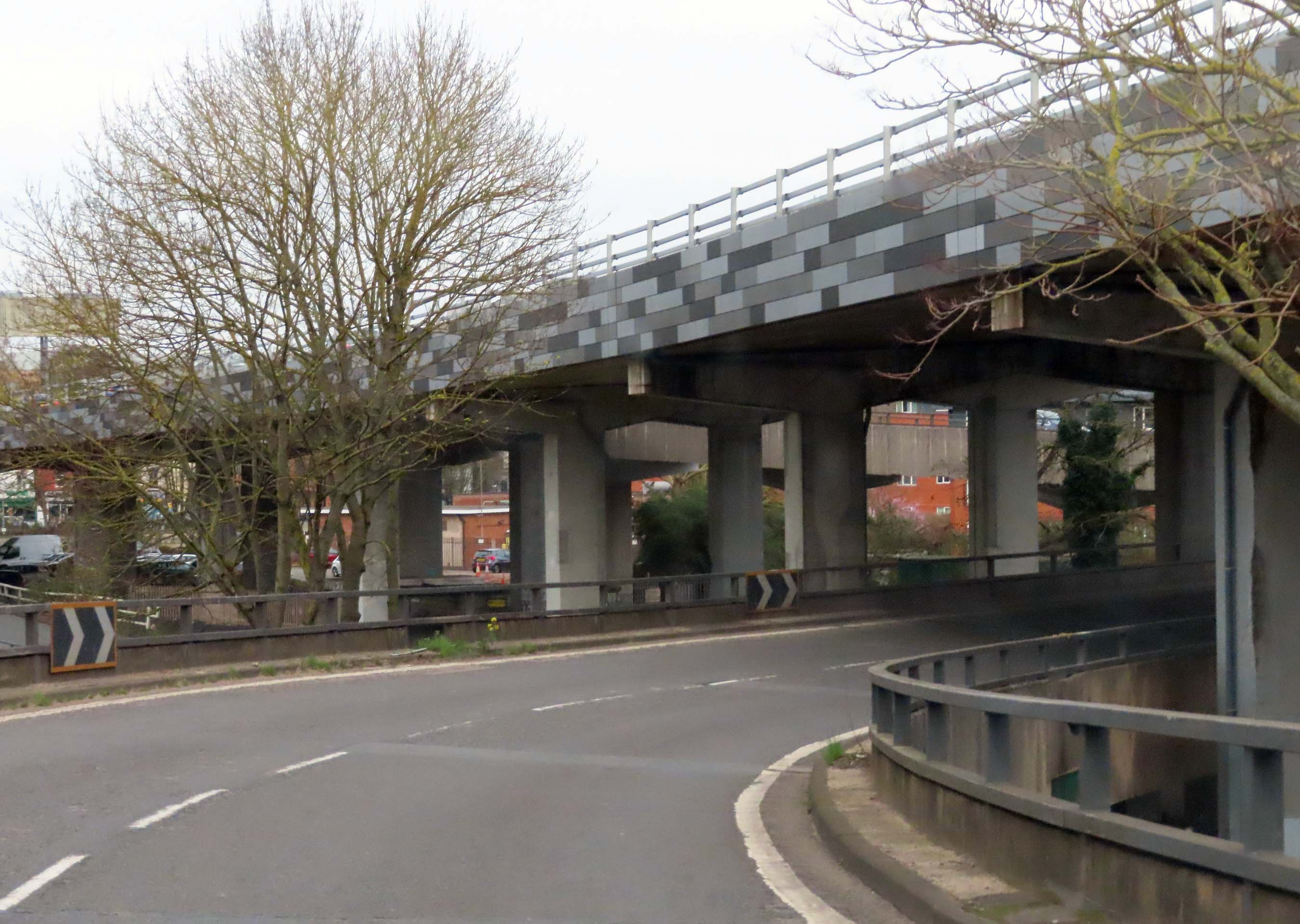
Elevated ring road at the Leicester radial junction

Stage five comprised the eastern section, linking the stage two and stage one sections between junction 1 and junction 4. The section included the building of junctions 2 and 3. The line of the stage crossed the River Sherbourne, downstream from the city centre, where surveyors found an artesian aquifer. This difficult terrain and the grade-separated junctions made it impractical to build the road at ground level so an elevated carriageway was constructed while also culverting the river as it ran underneath junction 3. This extended an existing culvert which had been built during the 1950s and 1960s, taking the river underground for most of its route through the city centre. Steel prices had increased during the construction of stages three and four, so the council decided to use pre-stressed concrete supports rather than steel. They programmed a LEO III computer to assist with predicting the structural load on the roadway. Stage five was the longest to date with a length of 1,200 yards (1,100 m), of which 950 yards (870 m) were elevated. It was also the most expensive to date, with an eventual cost of £4.6 million (equivalent to £58,100,000 in 2025) including land purchases.

Detailed plans for the stage were released in June 1965 during the construction of stages three and four, with compulsory purchase orders for the properties on the route issued at the same time. The contract for the construction of the project was put out to tender in late 1966, with Galliford chosen once again. Demolition and clearing of the route was underway by late 1967, and a £3.2 million MOT grant (equivalent to £51,000,000 in 2025) was approved, despite a government freeze on public spending at the time. It was projected to take two and a half years to complete. Work began in March 1968, and by June of that year the culverting work on the Sherbourne and erection of the concrete vertical supports was underway, with around six columns completed every week. From September 1968, a total of 765 concrete box beams were brought by road from the Dow-Mac concrete plants at Tallington and Gloucester, each weighing around 41 long tons (42 t) with lengths up to 82 feet (25 m). T-beams were also imported for use on the slip roads. Galliford used a pair of 50-long-ton (51 t) cranes to lift the beams into place. Beam laying was finished in mid-1969 and was followed by approximately ten months of road surfacing and finishing, including decorative slabs made with white spar from the Isle of Skye, which the designers hoped would "soften the starkness" of the concrete.

The 400-yard (370 m) stretch from junction 1 to junction 2 opened first, in August 1969. The road linking Foleshill Road with Stoney Stanton Road and the Coventry & Warwickshire Hospital was closed to traffic, other than buses and ambulances, with other vehicles using the ring road and White Street. The remainder of the stage was completed on schedule with an official ceremony on 4 June 1970 at St Mary's Guildhall and inaugural drive on the road by the Lord Mayor, followed by the opening of the road to the public. The completion of stage five meant that only the southern section between St Patrick's Road and the Queen's Road remained to be completed, and traffic could circumnavigate the city centre without having to use the inner circulatory road. Despite this, the council found that many motorists were continuing to use the old routes in the immediate aftermath of the opening.

=== Stage six: London Road – Queen's Road ===
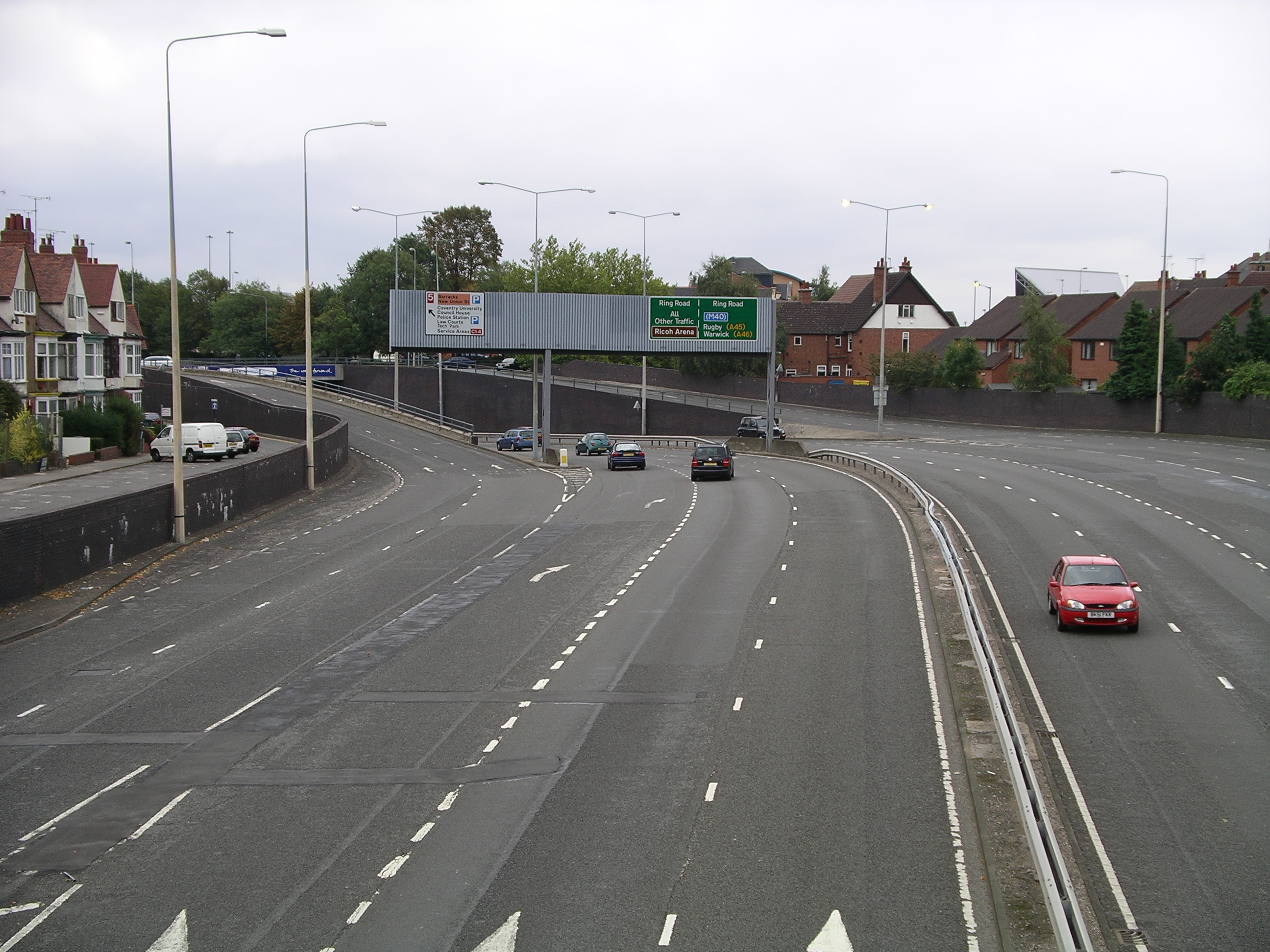
View anticlockwise between junctions 6 and 5, with weaving lanes

The final stage covered the section south of the city centre, completing the full ring by joining the end of stage five at junction 4 with stage three at Queen's Road and constructing junctions 5 and 6. The stage replaced part of St Patrick's Road and included a rebuild of stage one, to upgrade it to the full-width grade-separated standard of the later sections. The cost was estimated in 1971 to be around £5.5 million (equivalent to £69,500,000 in 2025), of which slightly more than £4 million (equivalent to £50,600,000 in 2025) was to be covered by a government grant. It had initially been proposed in the early 1960s that the work in the area would include widening the A429 Warwick Road, but there was local opposition citing the loss of 47 mature trees and the plan was abandoned.

Compulsory purchase orders for this phase were issued in late 1969. An inquiry was held in July 1970, examining two outstanding objections from property owners, but the MOT approved the stage, noting that the public benefits of building the stage outweighed the objections. Two monuments were temporarily removed during the construction work and put into storage. The first was the Coventry Martyrs memorial, located in a small garden at the intersection of Quinton Road and Park Road – it was eventually put back in the centre of the junction 5 roundabout. The other was the monument to the nineteenth century bicycle entrepreneur James Starley, which was taken from Greyfriars Green and put into storage, then relocated to another position on the green after work was complete.

Stage six was opened with an official ceremony on 19 September 1974. There was a minor dispute between the city council and the newly formed West Midlands County Council regarding the attendees at the ceremony. The latter authority had been given responsibility for transport across the county in April 1974 and supervised the final few months of the work, which meant they were responsible for the opening. But representatives of the city council, which had managed the ring-road project for most of its 25-year duration, felt that they should be leading the occasion. The Lord Mayor of Coventry, Dennis Berry, cut a length of tape across the junction 6 underpass to declare it open. In his speech, he congratulated officials from the council who had overseen the project since its inception, but also lamented the "frustration and delay" which had lengthened the work from its original six-year timetable. There were also speeches by two officials from the county council. After 14 years the ring road was complete, with a final overall cost of £14.5 million (equivalent to £137,500,000 in 2025).

=== Later developments ===
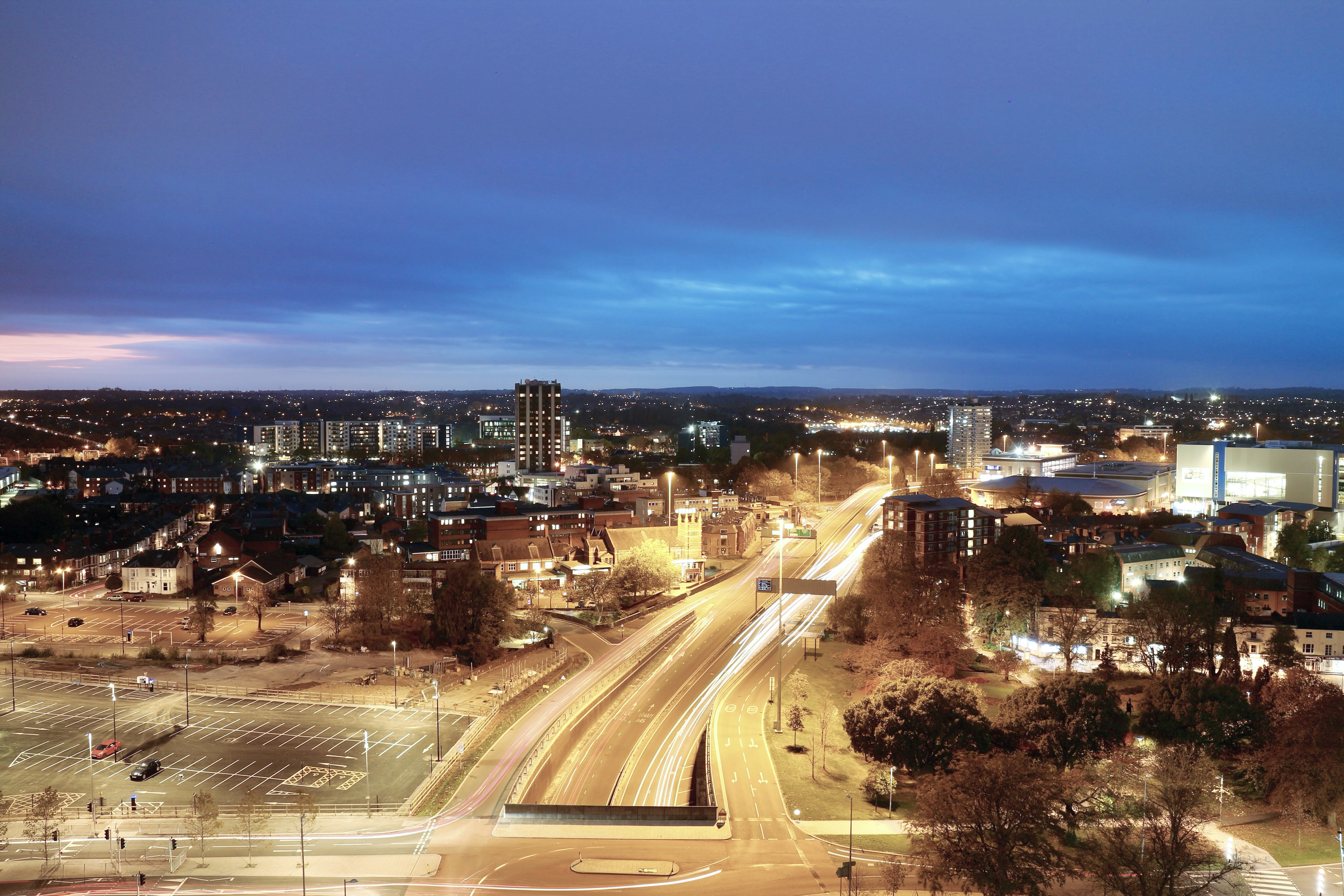
Junction 6 following the 2014–15 redesign

In 2004, Coventry's city council developed an urban renewal plan centred around the Swanswell area, which lies north east of the city centre and is bisected by the ring road. The initial draft, written by the Urban Initiatives organisation, described the ring road as having a "barrier effect" on the area and contained proposals to reduce or eliminate this. Four options were proposed: to remove junction 2 of the road, to replace the elevated road between junctions 1 and 3 with a surface street, to replace the elevated section with a tunnel or to keep the road more-or-less as it was. The 2004 draft labelled the surface-street option as its preferred solution, but a 2007 public report on the initiative stated that the council preferred the removal of junction 2, with leaving the road unchanged as the preferred option if removing the junction proved infeasible. In 2017, the council produced an action plan for the city centre which continued to note the obstructive effect of the road and retained removal of junction 2's slip roads as an "opportunity" which existed, but as of 2022 the road around Swanswell remained in its original configuration. In 2017 and 2020, the council undertook major refurbishment of the Swanswell section and added signage saying "Welcome to Coventry" on the viaduct there.

In 2014–15, the council carried out a major redevelopment of junction 6. In the biggest alteration to the ring road's layout since it opened, the roundabout and pedestrian bridges at the junction were removed and replaced with a 110-yard (100 m) wide deck, the ring road running underneath. The scheme, part of a wider development creating the Friargate business district, cost £14.9 million to complete. Once built, the deck was landscaped to provide a link to Greyfriars Green to the north, a pedestrian walkway providing a continuous link between Coventry railway station to the south and the city centre to the north. The redeveloped junction retained three of the four movements on and off the ring road from Warwick Road, but the ability to join the eastbound carriageway was removed. Two days after the development was officially opened, the ring road was temporarily closed underneath the new deck, hosting a racing circuit as part of the Coventry MotoFest.

In 2021, the UK government mandated the city council to improve Coventry's air quality as part of efforts to reduce nitrogen dioxide (NO_{2}) levels. The area with the highest NO_{2} was around Spon End and Holyhead Road, and the government said it would impose a Clean Air Zone in that area if the council failed to make improvements. In response, the council proposed changes affecting the ring road, including a redesign of junction 7 and a new link between the junction 8 clockwise exit slip road and Upper Hill Street. The goal of the latter change was to avoid a bottleneck on Holyhead Road for ring-road traffic destined for Coundon Road, but as of June 2022 this was in doubt due to the need to acquire land and opposition from a primary school on the route. The junction 7 work began in April 2022, involving removal of the roundabout at that junction and its replacement with a direct route under the flyover from the Butts radial into the city centre. This work was completed in late 2023.

== Design and construction ==
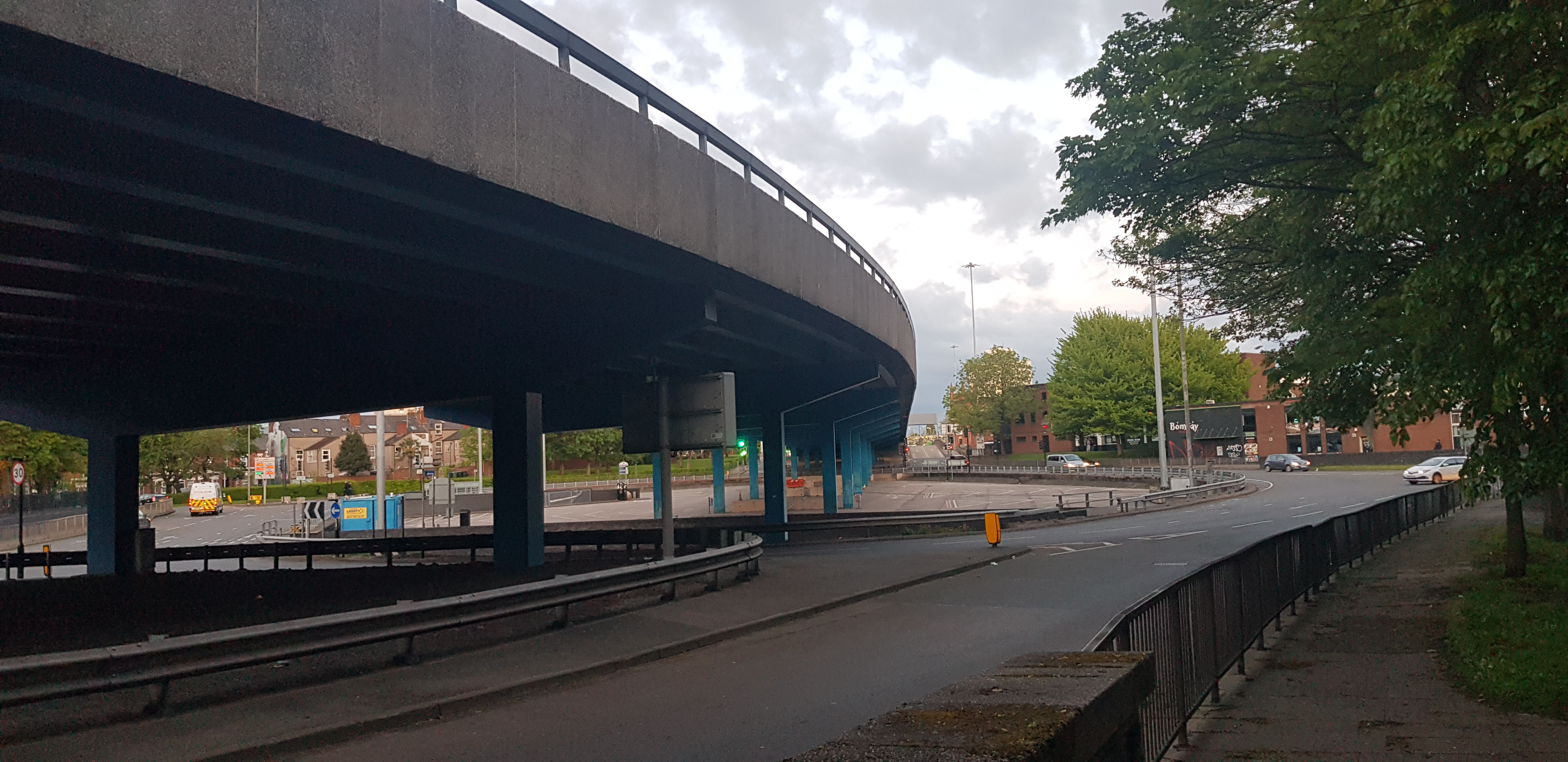
Junction 7 prior to the 2020s rebuild, with the steel-girdered Moat Street flyover and a car park inside the roundabout

The ring road forms a complete loop around Coventry city centre and is entirely grade separated with the exception of junction 1. The weaving distance between junctions is only 300 feet (90 m) in places and research by Brian Redknap, city engineer during the construction of the road, indicated that it was it was the first urban road in the world to use grade separation and weaving at such a small scale. The Ringway St Nicholas section, between junctions 9 and 1, retains pavements on both sides as well as the cycle track on the anti-clockwise side, per the stage two specification. Following the junction 6 redesign, a 110-yard (100 m)-wide walkway crosses over the ring road underpass to link the railway station and the city centre. On all other sections pedestrian areas are segregated from the road by fences and walls, with foot access between the inside and outside achieved via a series of bridges and subways. The road is not an official motorway and it is legal for cyclists to use it, but after the decision in the early 1960s to drop the road's cycle lanes and convert it to a full grade-separated dual carriageway, most cyclists consider it too dangerous.

The ring road features a number of different junction designs, reflecting the nature of the road in the area concerned as well as the dates at which the stages were completed. The two elevated junctions constructed during stages three and four – Moat Street and Hill Cross – utilise a roundabout with slip roads and a flyover. The designers chose a viaduct structure rather than an embankment at these junctions and positioned the abutments some distance from the roundabouts and slip roads, to maximise visibility. The close spacing of all nine junctions necessitated a trade-off between the gradient of the slip roads and the length of the weaving space between the junctions. The designers gave the latter consideration relatively more importance than the former, with the result that the slip lanes are all quite steep, ranging from 5.5 to 7.1 per cent gradient. The junction 2 slip roads have an unusual design – the proximity to the Foleshill Road junction led the designers to position all of the lanes to the south of White Street, the north-facing lanes forming curved loops underneath the main carriageway.

In the early 1960s it was planned for there to be direct links between the ring road and rooftop car parks in the central shopping area via a series of bridges, to reduce traffic on surface roads. This plan, which would have involved further demolition of properties, was later abandoned on the grounds of cost and practicality with access to car parks instead provided via the inner circulatory road. A number of new car parks were built, with space for 10,000 vehicles arranged such that long-stay parking was close to the ring road and short-stay closer to the shopping areas. Several of the car parks are situated directly underneath the elevated sections of the road itself, including under the long stretch in the east built during stage five and, until the 2020s junction 7 rebuild, inside the roundabout under the Moat Street flyover. The latter was initially reserved on weekdays for employees of the General Electric Company factory in Spon Street but it later became a full-time public car park. Junction 2 has a coach park, constructed in the spaces enclosed by the junction's curved slip lanes.

== Reception and popular culture ==
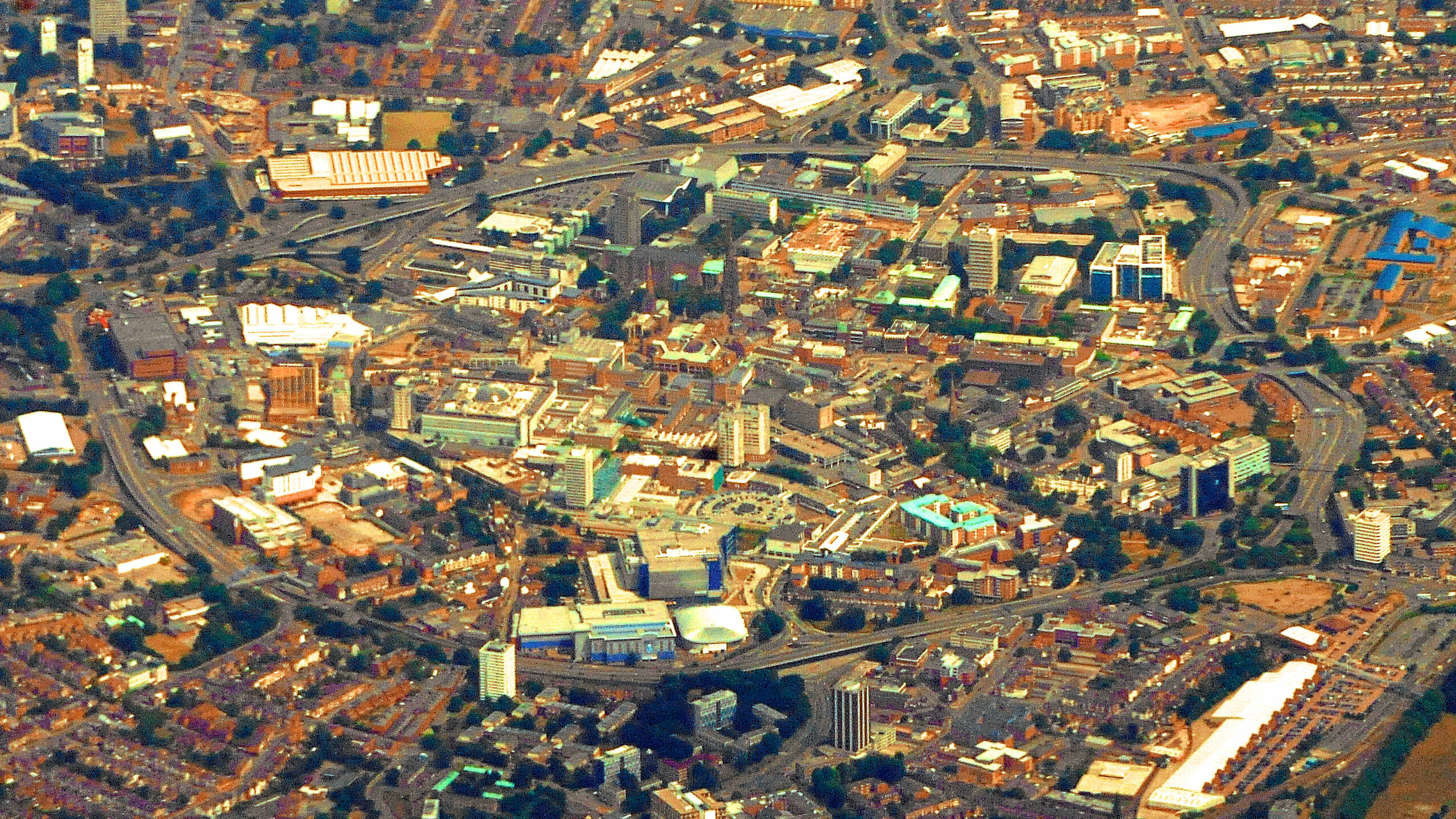
Aerial view of the entire ring road, enclosing Coventry city centre, looking from west to east

The city council and the ring road's engineers generally regarded it as a success. Speaking in a 2009 documentary produced in partnership with the Coventry Transport Museum, Duncan Elliott, the council's head of city centre property development, said that the road "works brilliantly", citing a lack of traffic congestion in the area as well as the low accident rate – he described it as "probably the safest road in Coventry". In the same production Redknap noted that it was designed for the predicted traffic flows in 1981, but said that in 2009 it "still worked extremely well, considering it was 25 years beyond the design period".

The road also has some critics, for example architects Caroline and Jeremy Gould, who wrote that "the tight circle drawn by the ring road and its configuration as an urban motorway with grade separated junctions has sharply and arbitrarily divided the centre from the remainder of the city". In a 2009 report commissioned by English Heritage and used as evidence by Coventry City Council in planning city centre development, Gould and Gould recommended that the ring road be "rethought as an encircling boulevard, not an urban motorway and the connections to it from both the centre and outside made negotiable and attractive". In a 2015 book, the same authors commented on the pedestrian subways linking areas outside the road with the city centre, writing that they necessitated "tortuous and uncomfortable detours", as well as the impact of the road's construction on green space in the city centre, with Greyfriars Green reduced in size and Lady Herbert's Garden "crammed up against Swanswell Ringway". A 2006 survey by the Coventry Telegraph found that many city residents regarded the subways as unsafe, and took lengthy detours or crossed the ring road directly to avoid using them. The Friargate redevelopment at junction 6 and the 2020s remodelling of junction 7 are eliminating some of these subways in favour of direct pedestrian routes.

As one of the few British cities to see its ring road project pushed to completion, Coventry has received considerable attention as a source of research for post-war architecture, as well as from road enthusiasts. The road has a reputation for being difficult to navigate, particularly for drivers from outside the city, as a result of its nine closely spaced junctions and complex lane layout. BBC News, in a 2014 article titled "Are these the worst ring roads in England?" included Coventry on its list, citing these driver difficulties, along with the view that the road creates a physical barrier isolating the city centre from its suburbs. In a follow-up article, the BBC revealed that they had received many letters from readers agreeing with this negative view of the road, but that numerous other respondents had praised the road, citing its design and the speed with which the city can be navigated by using it. The piece concluded that "you either love it or you hate it". Journalist Christopher Beanland, writing in The Guardian, likened driving on the road to riding a roller coaster.

In 2015, a group of nine writers and nine film-makers, led by Coventry artist Adam Steiner, created a series of poetry films about the ring road. Titled Disappear Here, the project was funded with grants from Arts Council England and Coventry City Council and was used as part of Coventry's successful bid for the status of UK City of Culture 2021. In interviews with the BBC and the Guardian, Steiner commented that "it is the duty of artists and citizens to engage with issues of public space, control of architecture and the human experience of our built environment" and cited the ring road as having a "great presence, not dissimilar to the old city walls". He also said that driving on the road was reminiscent of a driving a Scalextric toy car.

== Junctions ==
mi	km	Junction	Destinations	Coordinates	Refs
0.0	0.0	1	B4113 – M6 north, Coventry Building Society Arena	52.4131°N 1.5091°W	
0.2	0.3	2	B4109 – Pool Meadow Bus Station, White Street	52.4114°N 1.5063°W	
0.5	0.8	3	A4600 – M1 north, M69 to Leicester, A428 to Rugby	52.4080°N 1.5021°W	
0.7	1.1	4	A4114 – M1 to London, M40 to Oxford, A423 to Banbury, A46 to Warwick, A45 to Northampton, Coventry Airport	52.4048°N 1.5023°W	
1.0	1.6	5	Quinton Road, Mile Lane	52.4037°N 1.5083°W	
1.3	2.0	6	– Kenilworth, War Memorial Park, Coventry railway station	52.4032°N 1.5146°W	
1.5	2.5	7	B4101 – Earlsdon, Coventry Skydome	52.4060°N 1.5188°W	
1.8	2.9	8	A4114 – A45 to Birmingham	52.4096°N 1.5187°W	
2.0	3.2	9	B4098 – Tamworth, Belgrade Theatre	52.4116°N 1.5149°W	
2.3	3.7	Continues back to junction 1			
