= Spon End Viaduct =

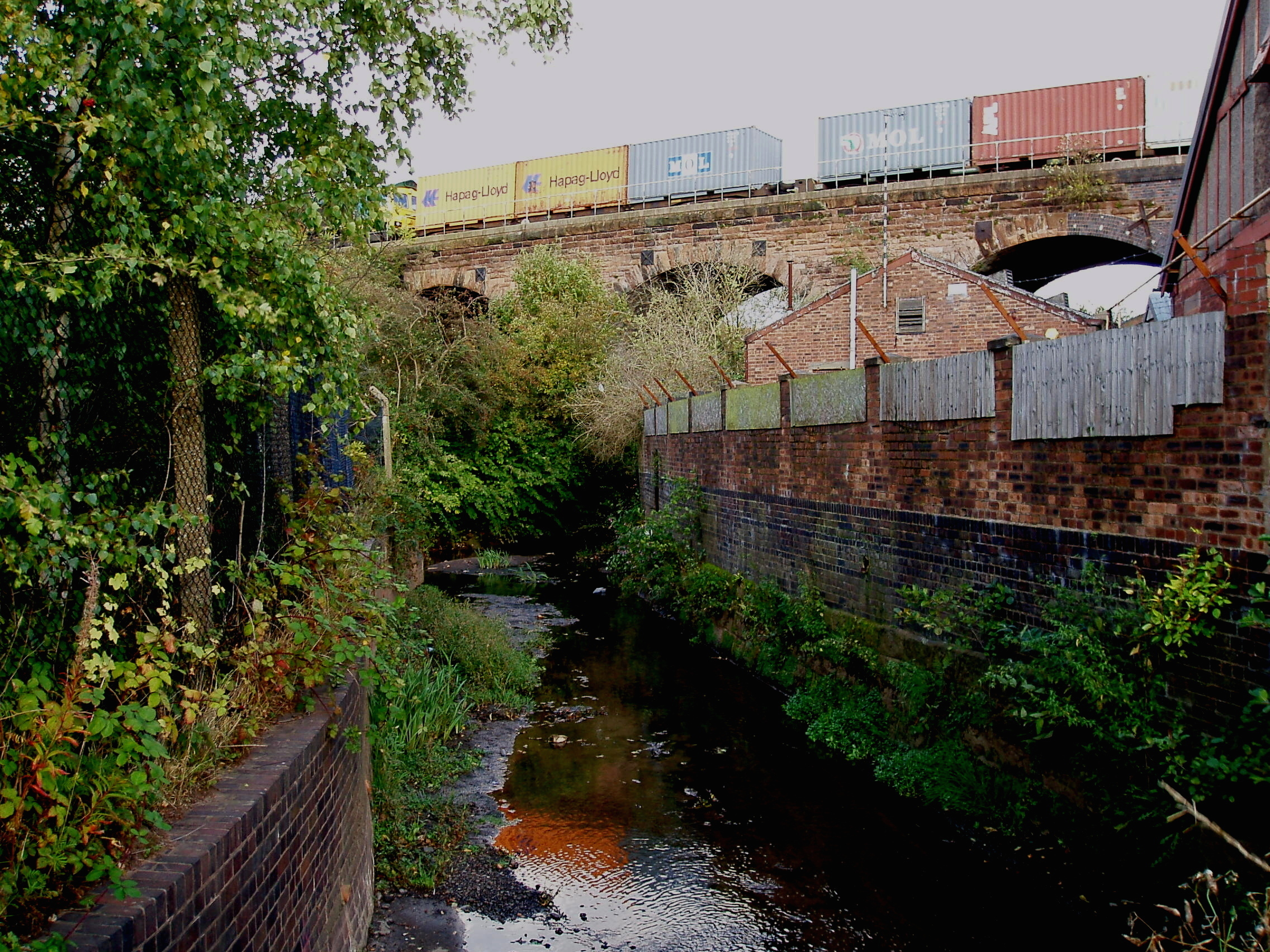
- The viaduct as it crosses the Sherbourne; the join between the rebuilt and original arches can be seen on the right
- Coordinates: 52.40840°N 1.52796°W
- Carries: Coventry–Nuneaton line
- Crosses: River Sherbourne
- Locale: Spon End, Coventry, England
- Maintained by: Network Rail
- Heritage status: Locally listed

Characteristics
- Material: Stone, brick
- Total length: 0.25 miles (0.40 km)
- No. of spans: 28

History
- Opened: 1850

Location
- Interactive map of Spon End Viaduct

Spon End Viaduct is a railway bridge which spans the River Sherbourne in Spon End, just west of the city centre of Coventry in central England.

== Description and history ==
The viaduct is just north of Coventry station on the Coventry to Nuneaton railway line. It spans the River Sherbourne and its flat valley as it passes through Spon End, a suburb just to the west of Coventry city centre. Construction started in 1848 and the line opened in 1850. The viaduct is a quarter of a mile (0.4 kilometres) long and consists of 28 arches, each with a 48 feet (15 metres) span. In 1857, 23 of the arches collapsed. The collapse was blamed on shoddy workmanship and poor quality materials. The collapsed section was rebuilt but the line was not able to reopen until October 1860. Not all of the viaduct was rebuilt, as part of the original viaduct was deemed to be good enough to be reused. An act of parliament had to be sought to authorise the reconstruction works. In the meantime, Coundon Road became the temporary terminus of the line. The stone for the original arches may have been from a lineside quarry near Coundon Road station, which is just north of the viaduct. The rebuilt arches were in blue engineering brick and joined on to the remaining stone arches. The height and width of the arches make the viaduct a prominent local landmark. It is on Coventry City Council's register of locally listed buildings and forms part of the Spon End conservation area, which was declared in 2003.

George Demidowicz, in an architectural history of Coventry, compared the viaduct to the Coat of Arms Bridge to the south on the line to Leamington Spa. He described the viaduct as "on a very different scale" and dominating Spon End, which is otherwise characterised by some of Coventry's few remaining medieval buildings.

== See also ==
- Sherbourne Viaduct, another railway viaduct over the same river in the south east of Coventry
