= Spon End =

Suburb of Coventry, England

Coordinates: 52°24′N 1°31′W

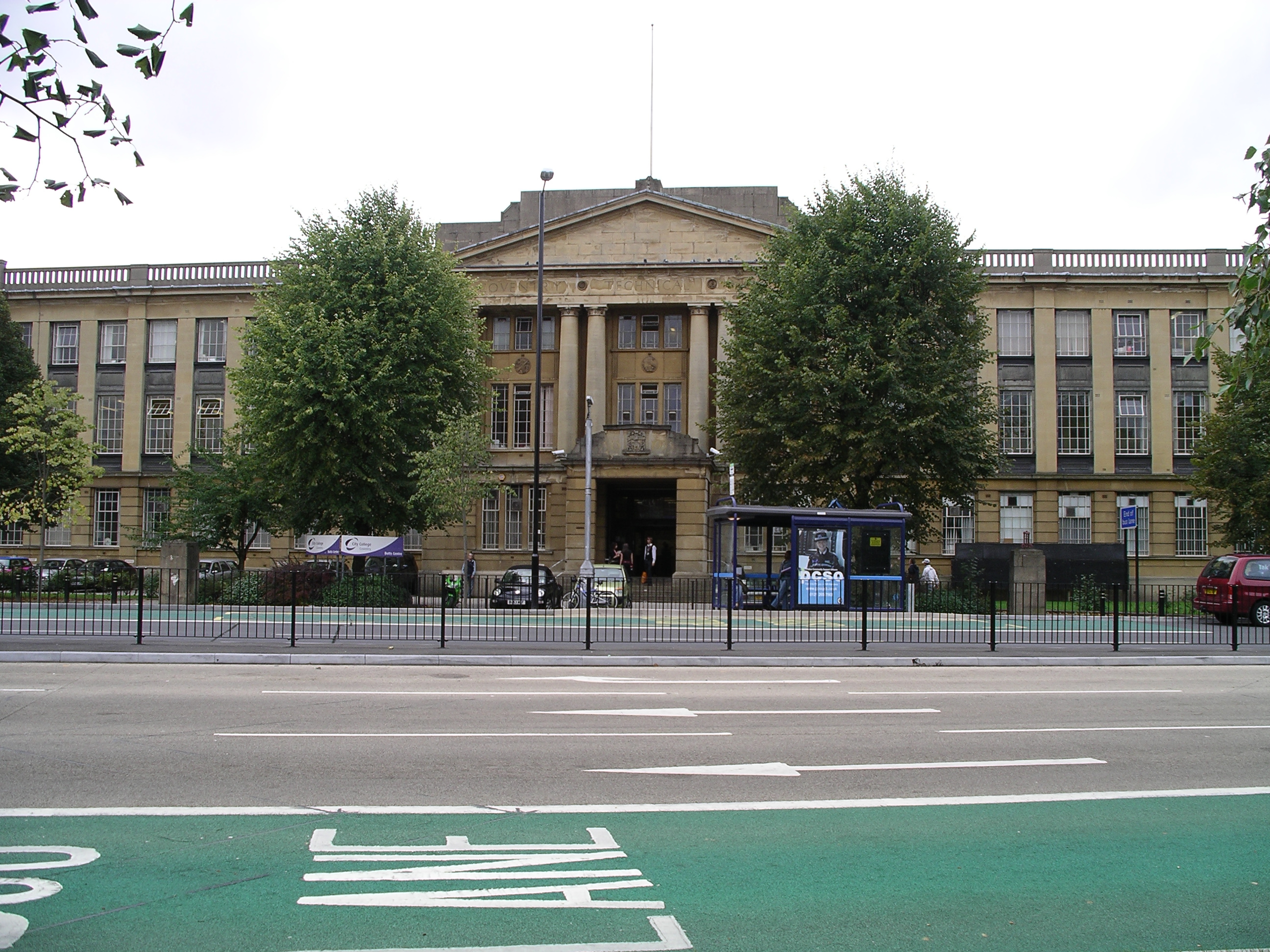
Butts Centre, Butts Rd, Spon End

Spon End is a suburb of Coventry, England. It is situated west of Coventry city centre. The Butts Park Arena and a Premier Inn hotel are situated on the main road through Spon End. The Butts Park Arena, which was opened in 2004, is the home of Coventry Rugby Football club. Coventry Bears rugby league club and Coventry United and Coventry United L.F.C. football clubs are tenants of Coventry Rugby club and also play at Butts Park Arena where an all-weather pitch has been installed. Coventry Bears rugby league club were tenants until 2022.

The hotel is located in a building that used to be the home of City College Coventry (formally called Coventry Technical College, often previously referred to as "The Butts"). That building also houses a community arts centre called The Albany Theatre.

The headquarters of the Government department Ofqual – The Office of Qualifications and Examinations Regulation – is located between the hotel and the rugby ground.

== Transport ==
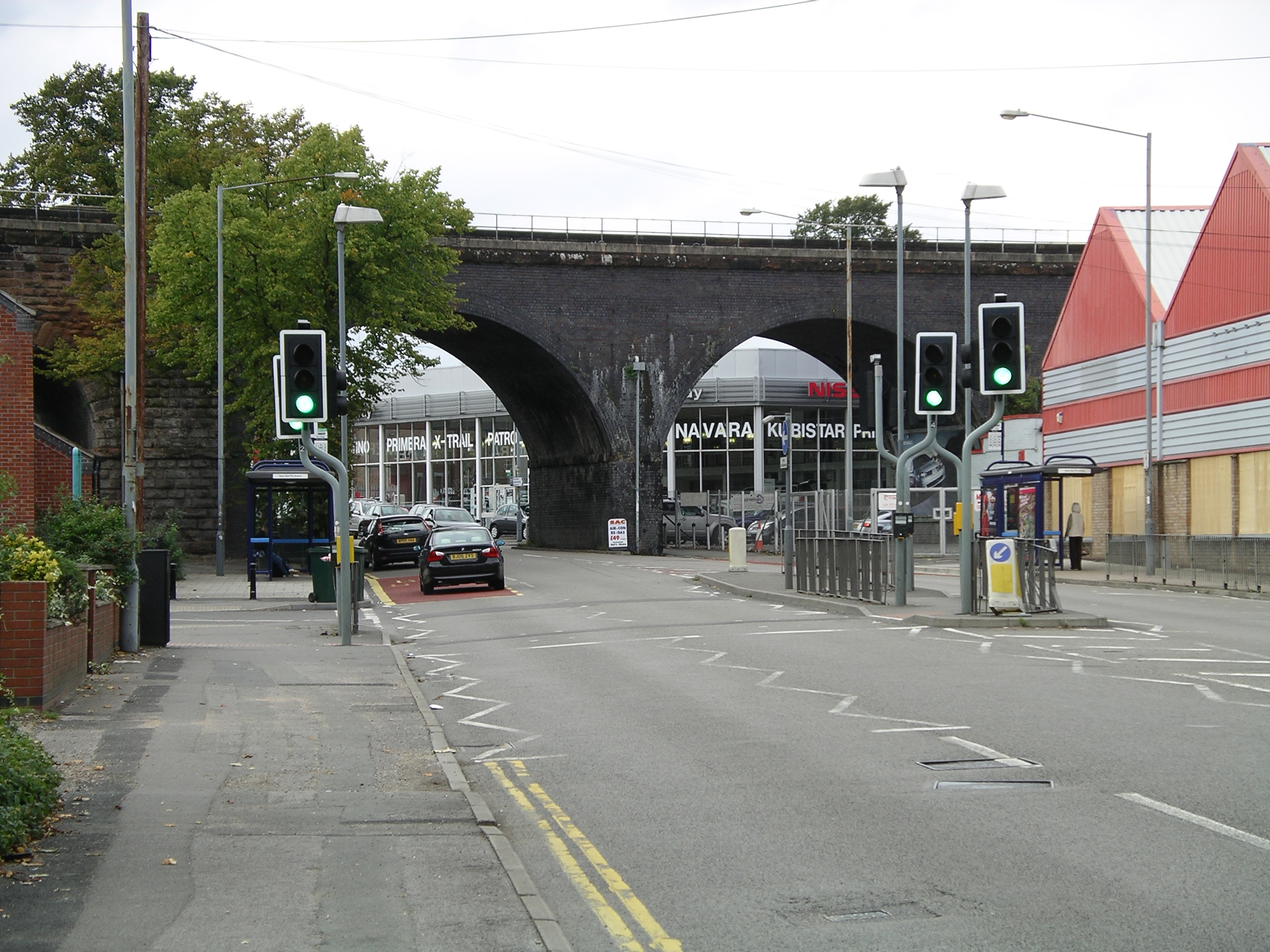
Spon End Viaduct

The railway line linking Coventry and Nuneaton passes over the River Sherbourne on Spon End Viaduct. The river then continues through the area under Spon Bridge, through a post-war housing estate, and under Vignoles Bridge before entering a culvert at the edge of the city centre. The area was historically connected to the city centre by Spon Street, though this ceased when the Coventry Inner Ring Road was built, cutting Spon Street in half. Adjacent areas besides the city centre include Earlsdon and Chapelfields.

== People ==
- Arthur Brown, Aston Villa footballer
- Albert Brown, Aston Villa footballer
