= River Sherbourne =

Sherbourne
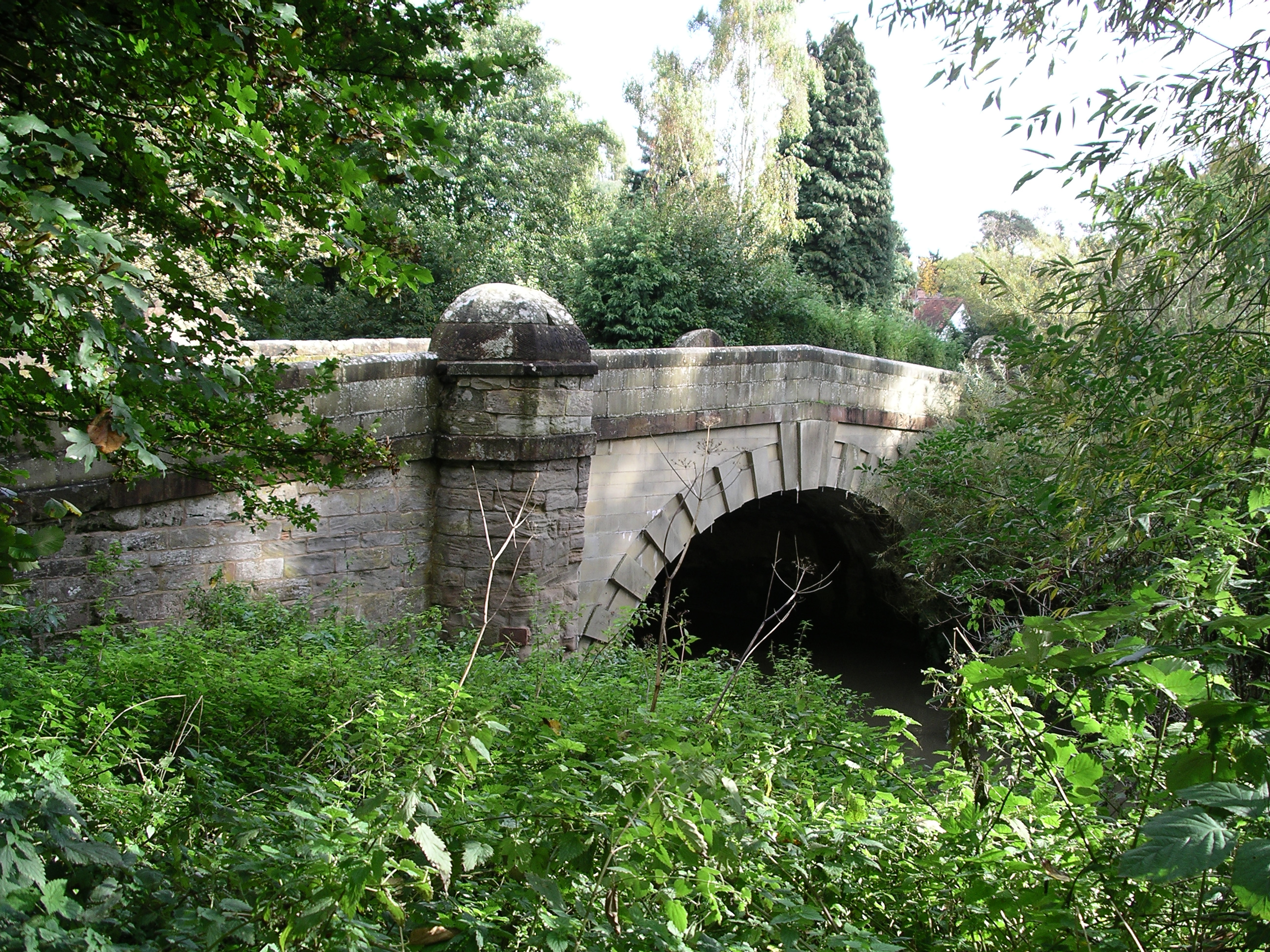
- Whitley Abbey Bridge, over the River Sherbourne in Whitley.

Location
- Country: England
- County: West Midlands
- City: Coventry

Physical characteristics
- Source
  - location: Hawkes End, Allesley
- Mouth: River Sowe
  - location: Baginton
  - coordinates: 52°22′35″N 1°29′38″W

The River Sherbourne is a river that flows through the city of Coventry in the West Midlands, England. The name Sherbourne is said to derive from Scir Burna, "clear stream" in Old English.

== Course ==
The source of the river is in the fields near Hawkes End in the parish of Allesley. It flows for about 8 mi (13 km) in a generally southeastern direction.

The Sherbourne is crossed by both a pedestrian and vehicular bridge in Lake View Park, Coundon. Warwickshire Wildlife Trust in partnership with Coventry City Council have carried out work to renaturalise the river's man-made straightened course through Lake View Park.

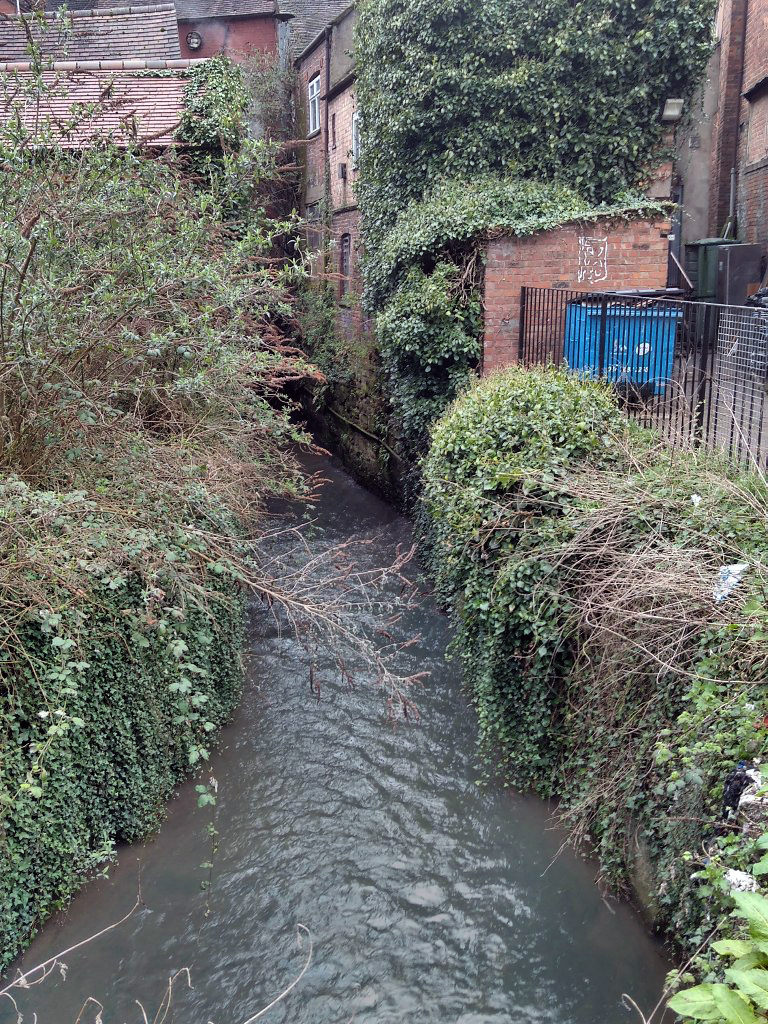
A glimpse of the River Sherbourne in Coventry city centre between Palmers Lane and The Burges

Towards the centre of Coventry the river flows through Spon End (where it is spanned by Vignoles Bridge) and becomes culverted just before it reaches the Inner Ring Road and Spon Street. In the city centre, the Sherbourne reappears briefly between Palmers Lane and The Burges. An Ordnance Survey map published in 1888 shows the course of the now largely culverted Sherbourne across Coventry city centre, passing Pool Meadow and a remnant of the city wall.

The river then flows under a railway viaduct and through the suburb of Whitley until it joins the River Sowe (a tributary of the River Avon) south of the A45 road near Baginton.

== Tributaries ==
The Sherbourne Valley Project map shows the named tributaries of the River Sherbourne from source to confluence with the River Sowe to be North Brook, Pickford Brook, Guphill Brook, Radford Brook, Springfield Brook, Spital Brook and Cheylesmore Brook.

== Plans ==
Coventry City Council has plans to open up a stretch of the river which is currently culverted, and runs beneath The Burges, a street in the city centre.

As part of the Sherbourne Valley Project, there are plans to return the river to its natural course, avoiding the current culverts and weirs, in the area of Coundon Wedge, west of Coventry. Specifically where the river is joined by the North Brook. This would allow fish to pass up and down the river more easily.

== Ecological status ==
Environment Agency monitoring shows the River Sherbourne to have a poor ecological status from 2009 to 2019, improving to moderate in 2022.

== Crossings ==
Notable crossings in downstream order from source to confluence with the Sowe:

- Spon End Viaduct
- Spon Bridge (grade II listed)
- Vignoles Bridge
- River is culverted beneath Coventry City Centre
- Gosford Street
- Bridge at the Charterhouse, off London Road
- The grade II-listed Sherbourne Viaduct carries the Rugby–Birmingham–Stafford line over the river.
- A4082 London Road
- Whitley Abbey Bridge (grade II listed)
- A45 road (Stonebridge Highway)
