= Spon Street =

Street in central Coventry, England

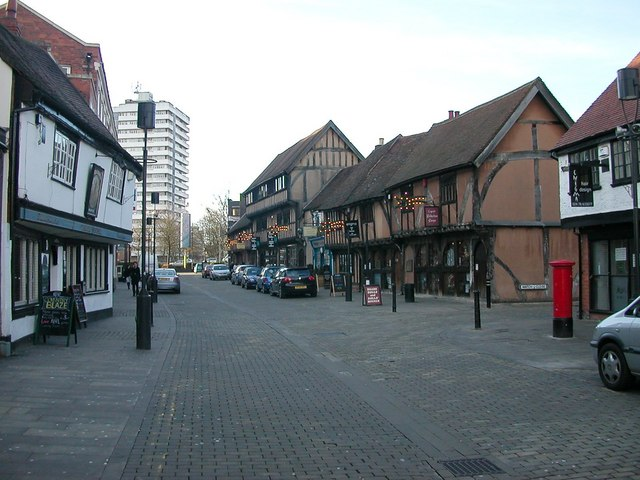
- Modern-day Spon Street, looking west towards Spon End
- Length: 0.16 mi (0.26 km)
- Location: Coventry, England
- Postal code: CV1
- Coordinates: 52.408016°N 1.516320°W

Spon Street (sometimes referred to as Historic Spon Street or Medieval Spon Street) is an historic street in central Coventry, in the West Midlands of England. The street was once part of a route that ran from Gosford to Birmingham – a route which remained intact (though superseded by more modern roads) until the 1960s. During the construction of Coventry's Inner Ring Road, built to relieve traffic on the narrow city centre streets, Spon Street was cut in half and the route severed.

== Route ==
The street originally ran from St John the Baptist Church out of the city centre to the west, through the area known as Spon End, to the bottom of Hearsall Lane. After the construction of the Inner Ring Road, only the lower part of the street (from St John's Church to the ring road) retained the name Spon Street. The eastern part of the section outside the ring road became an unnamed cycle path, while the section to the west is now known as Upper Spon Street.

== History ==
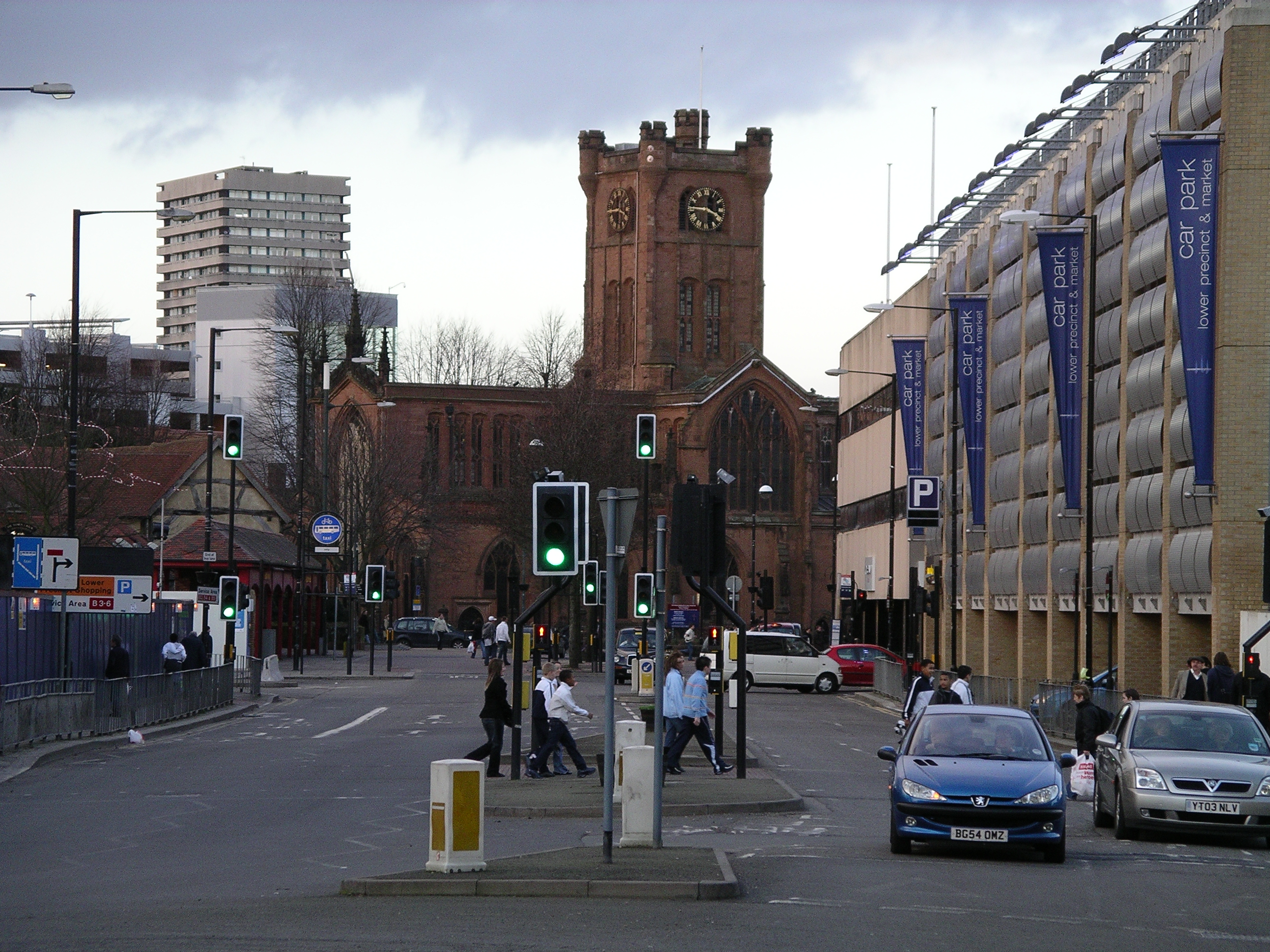
The 14th-century St John's Church and the very bottom of Spon Street

The Spon End neighbourhood started to form in the 12th and 13th centuries CE, when dyers and tanners congregated just outside the city wall next to the Birmingham road near the River Sherbourne. A fortified gate was built across the road in this area soon after 1391, which became known as Spon Gate. Dyers and tanners chose the area because it was far enough out of the city that they wouldn't disturb the residents with the foul smells of the substances used in their trades. They also needed easy access to clean water, provided by the river Sherbourne. Spon Street at this time was lined with bars and tenements, stretching from what is now the West Orchards shopping centre to the junction of Allesley Old Road and Hearsall Lane. Through the 14th and 15th centuries Spon Street continued to be dominated by the cloth and leather trades, with tanners, dyers and saddlers making up the majority of the residents. By the 19th century, though, the balance had shifted; at the 1851 census, as many as 137 households in Spon Street were involved in the watchmaking trade.

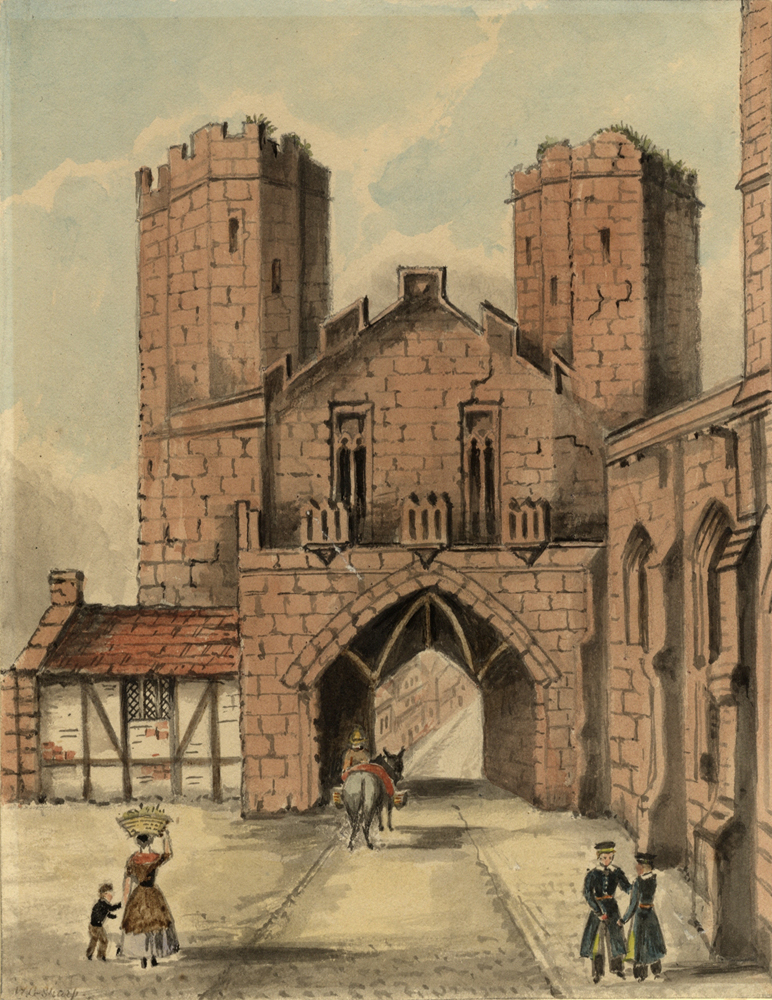
An artist's impression of Spon Gate, now demolished

Spon Gate, described as the most beautiful gate in the city wall, was demolished in the late 18th century to improve access into the city centre. Despite the removal of the gate, Spon Street itself was still narrow and congested, prompting the construction of Lower Holyhead Road in 1828.

Through the 19th and into the early 20th centuries many of the buildings on Spon Street were used as shops, especially towards the city centre. Spon Street itself escaped major damage in the Second World War, despite Spon End more widely being hit. The damage to Spon End, combined with the “drab and depressing appearance” of its Victorian housing stock led to the City Planning department's decision to declare the neighbourhood a “Comprehensive Development Area” in 1957. This designation allowed the compulsory purchase of properties in the area, including surviving medieval structures in Spon Street, to make way for housing developments. The compulsory purchase and demolition of buildings on the route of the Inner Ring Road in 1961-62 led to the loss of more historic buildings; a survey carried out in 1965 found that only 34 timber-framed buildings survived in the city, down from 100 recorded in 1958, and 240 after the war.

To recover from this “embarrassment” and protect the remaining buildings a scheme was initiated in 1967 to restore a number of shops in Spon Street, and to move threatened historic buildings from Much Park Street into Spon Street. The first restorations were carried out from 1968 to 1975, and the relocation of 7-10 Much Park Street took place in 1970–4. The restorations were criticised at the time for their lack of sensitivity – many historical features were removed because they were not original, including all the chimney stacks because they were made of Georgian or Victorian bricks. This approach to building restoration has been controversial since the mid 19th century, the Society for the Protection of Ancient Buildings saying that “it [seeks] to change the character of an old building by erasing the evidence and record of its true history”. Spon Street became one of the city's first Conservation Areas in 1967, and the buildings were Grade II listed in 1974.

== Spon Street today ==
Spon Street is now promoted as one of Coventry's primary tourist attractions, and contains a number of pubs, cafes and shops in original or relocated medieval buildings. Medieval streets lacked separate pavements, so Spon Street has flat kerbs to give this effect.

=== The Old Windmill ===
Among the businesses on the street is The Old Windmill, Coventry's oldest surviving pub. It is thought to date back to at least the 16th century, and was Grade II listed in 1974 along with the other buildings in Spon Street. It is a timber framed building with an oversailing first floor and a stucco finish on the exterior. The pub was a homebrew house until 1930, and had a brewing shed in a yard to the rear. An extensive renovation in 1985 enclosed the yard and opened the ground floor of the building up, expanding the bar.

=== 163-4 Spon Street ===
The building now sited at 163-4 Spon Street was originally located on Much Park Street, to the south east of the city centre. It was moved as part of Coventry's first "Townscape Scheme" beginning in 1970. The move was completed in 1974, at which point the building was Grade II listed. It is described as a three-storey timber-framed house, originally built in the late 15th or early 16th centuries with the first and second floors oversailing. As of 2020 it contains a HIFI equipment shop.

=== Spon Street substation ===
There is an electrical substation between 172 and 180 Spon Street which is concealed by a wooden fence displaying historical scenes and figures, as well as information about the street.

== See also ==
- History of Coventry
- The Shambles - an historic area of York containing medieval timber-framed buildings
