= Friargate Coventry =

New build business district in Coventry

Coordinates: 52°24′08″N 1°30′48″W

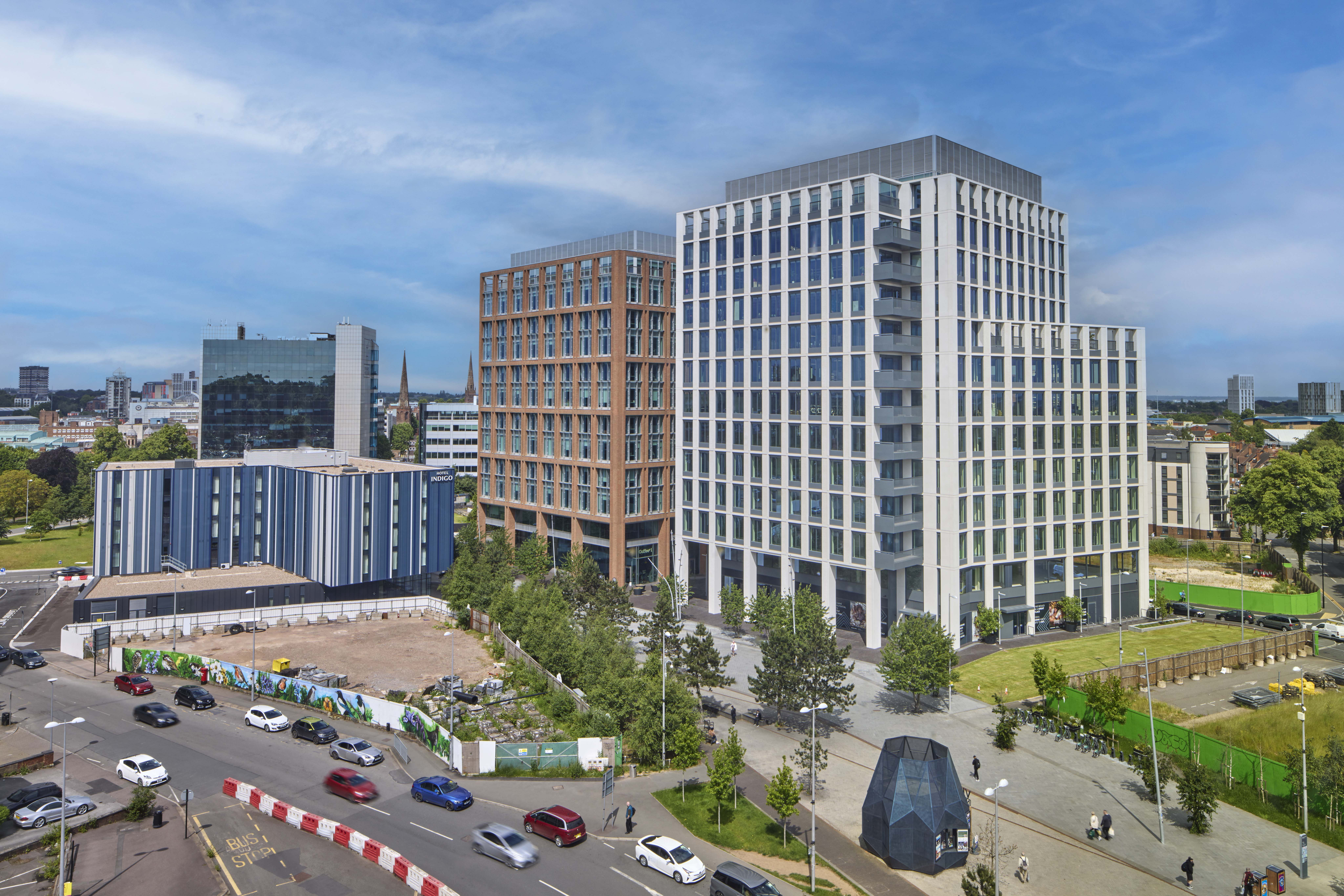
The Friargate development, Coventry as of 2025

The Friargate development is a business district in Coventry, covering 37 acres (15 ha) around Coventry Railway Station. Upon completion, it will comprise 25 new buildings, including fourteen Grade A office buildings, two hotels and new residential homes.

The project was scheduled to take 15 years to complete and is thought to be providing 15,000 new jobs at a cost of £100 million. It has been described by the Coventry Telegraph as one of the twelve new developments that will change Coventry forever.

The former leader of Coventry City Council, Cllr Ann Lucas, has stated that developments such as Friargate will help the city achieve its aim of being a top 10 UK city.

On 10^{th} March 2016, Station Square, the new public thoroughfare created as part of the development, was opened by Cllr Lucas. The space features more than 200 trees, stone benches and seats and was heralded as proof that Friargate is already changing the area.

== Ownership ==
Friargate Coventry LLP is the organisation that has been formed to bring forward the development of Friargate. This organisation is the development vehicle for Cannon Kirk, a Dublin-based property group.

== Location ==
Covering 37 acres (15 ha) in the south of the city centre, the Friargate development is situated in close proximity to Coventry Railway Station and Junction 6 of the Coventry ring road, offering extensive and reliable transport options from across the UK.

The development also sees the benefit of being located near a range of local businesses, schools and amenities, such as Central 6 retail park.

== History ==
The development’s timeline travels back as far as the 1960s, with office buildings and retail units located on the site. The most prominent of which was Station Tower, which was demolished in October 2015 to make way for the Friargate development due to being deemed no longer fit for purpose and outdated.

In 2016, a time capsule was buried underneath the development and is set to be unearthed 50 years later in 2066. The capsule will show future generations what life was like during the construction period. A copy of the Coventry Telegraph, a model of a Jaguar E-type, a supermarket receipt and a Friargate brochure were all included in the capsule.

The items inside the capsule were chosen by people in Coventry and were buried by pupils from St Osburg’s, Spon Gate and All Saints C of E primary schools.

== One Friargate ==
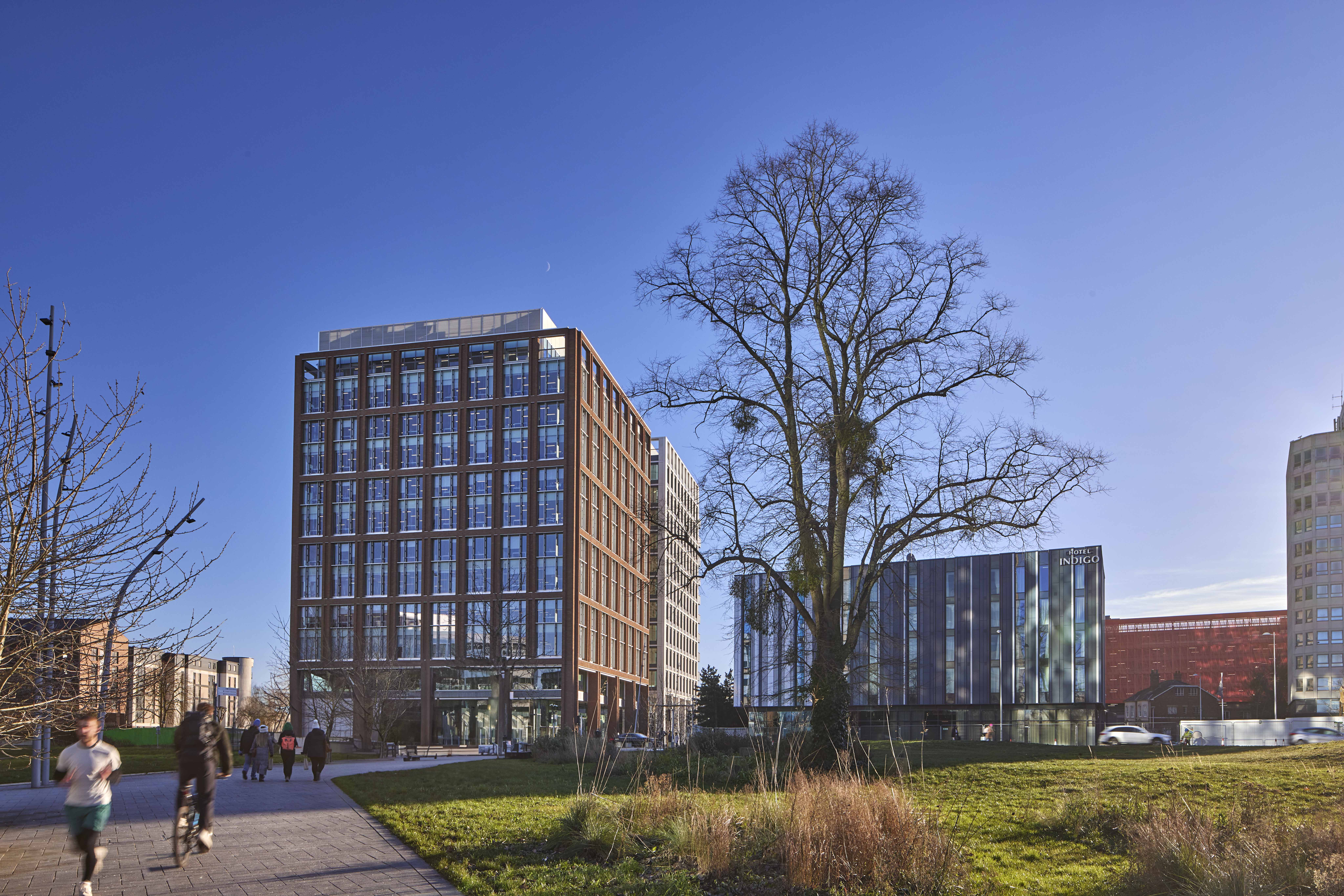
The One Friargate building, part of the Friargate development, Coventry as of 2025

Completed between 2015 and 2017, One Friargate is the first of multiple commercial properties built on the development.

The Grade A space spans 11 floors, comprising 125,000 sq ft. It has been designed for sustainability, accredited with BREEAM Excellent and EPC-B certifications. One Friargate also features LED lighting throughout, social and collaborative areas, dedicated meeting room suites and conferencing facilities, shower and changing rooms and secure cycle storage.

As of 2026, the building is currently occupied by a range of businesses, including Coventry City Council, Ofqual and E.ON.

== Two Friargate ==
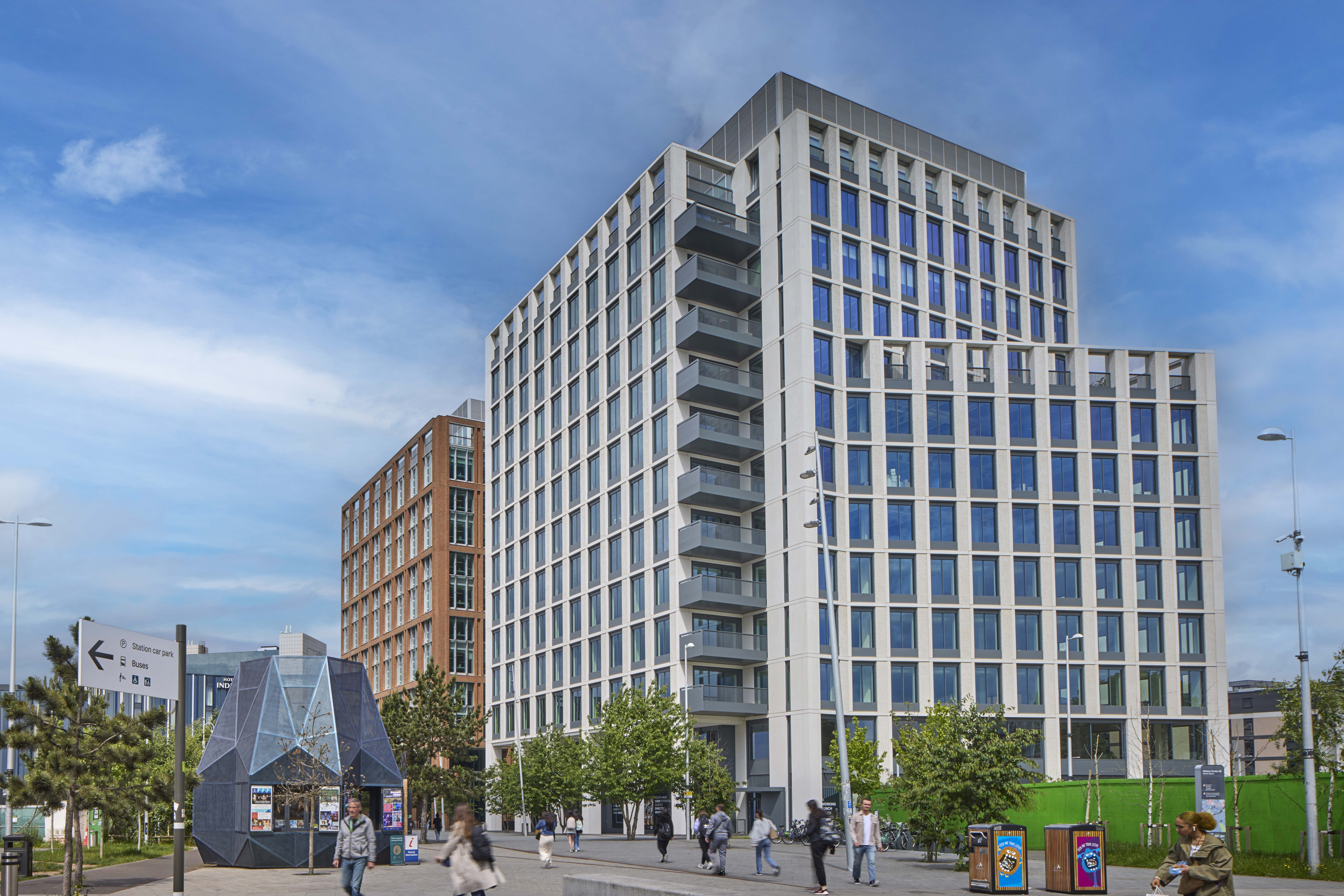
Two Friargate, the second building developed at the Friargate development, Coventry as of 2025

The second commercial building to be opened on the development, Two Friargate, was constructed between 2021 and 2024. It continues the strategy of offering premium workspace in Coventry city centre.

The building comprises 12 floors of workspace totalling 133,000 sq ft. It fulfils a further BREEAM Excellent space with an EPC-A certification, outdoor terraces, a balcony on every floor, a four-pipe fan cooling system and Heatline – an energy-efficient District Heating Scheme.

In 2026, Two Friargate’s ground floor retail space was occupied by Elle’s, a contemporary food hall and social hub developed by local hospitality specialists, Dhillon’s Brewery.

As of 2026, the building is currently occupied by SEGRO and Octopus Energy.

== Hotel Indigo ==
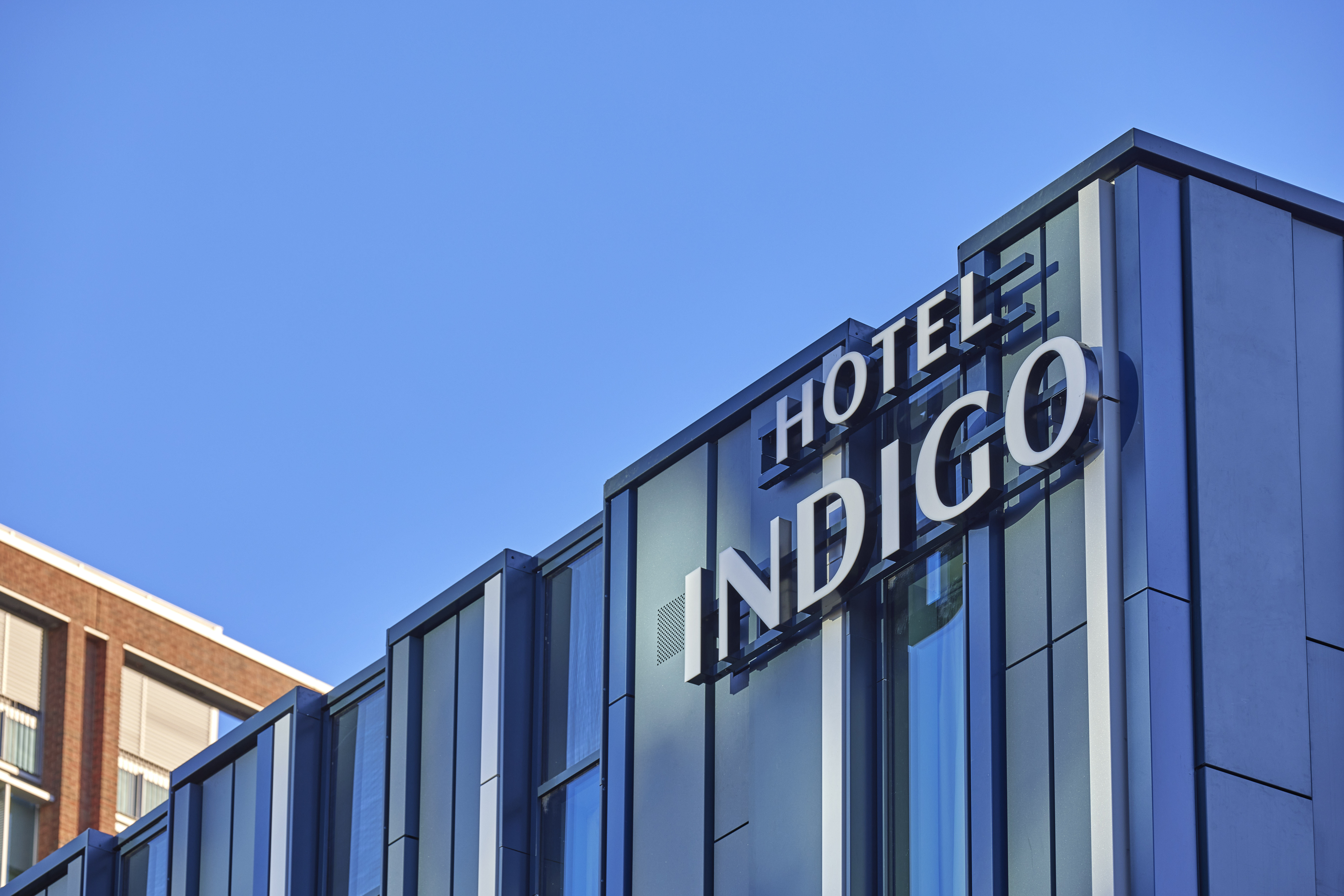
Hotel Indigo, Coventry is the landmark hotel at the Friargate development

The Friargate development’s first non-office space, Hotel Indigo offers boutique accommodation and is located opposite One Friargate.

First opening in 2024, the hotel features a variety of rooms and suites, as well as meeting space, a gymnasium and on-site dining at Cogs Bar & Kitchen.

== Masterplan ==
Once the 2.35M sq ft development is complete, Friargate will be a full mixed-use commercial district. It will feature a variety of spaces dedicated to office, retail, leisure and residential uses.

Up to 400 residential units are planned as part of the scheme, as well as a significant number of new jobs in the area. The development also has a dedicated focus on sustainability through a partnership with energy provider, Engie, for low carbon power.
