= Joey Faye =

American comedian and actor

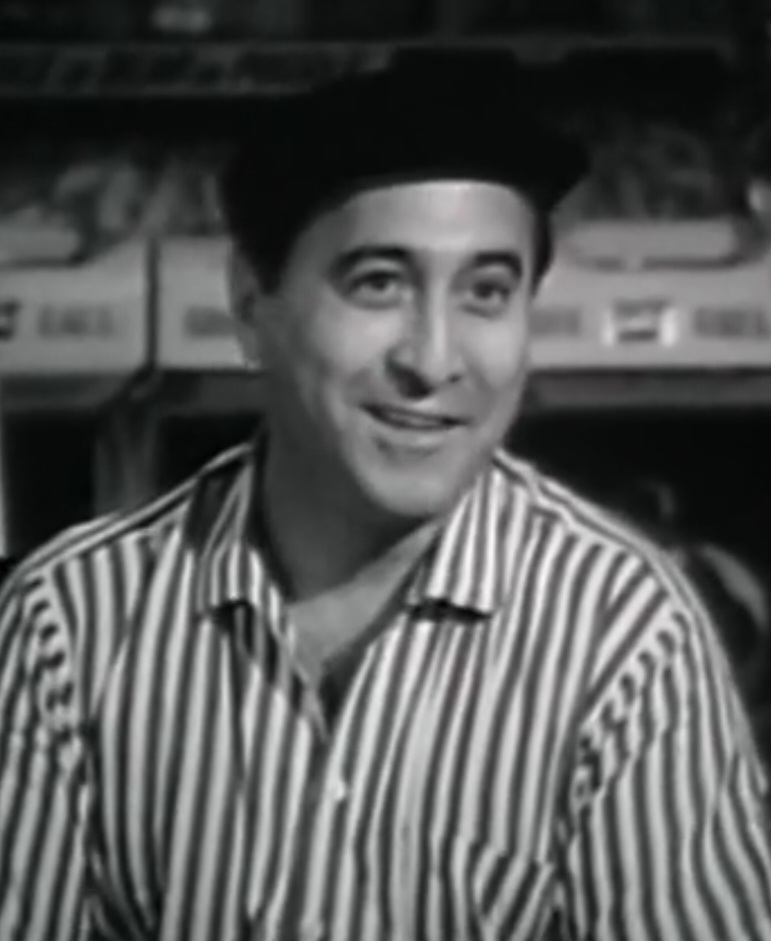
- Faye in an episode of Lock-Up (1960)
- Born: Joseph Antony Palladino; July 12, 1909; New York City, U.S.
- Died: April 26, 1997 (aged 87); Englewood, New Jersey, U.S.
- Occupations: Comedian, actor
- Years active: 1930–1994
- Spouses: Eileen Jenkins; Ginna Carr; Judy Carlin

Joey Faye (born Joseph Antony Palladino, July 12, 1909 or 1910 or 1902 – April 26, 1997) was an American comedian and actor.

Born in New York City, he gained fame as a comic in vaudeville and claimed that he created two of vaudeville's more renowned pieces of business, "Floogle Street" (a.k.a. "Susquehana Hat Company") and "Slowly I Turned". In addition to an active career in vaudeville and the legitimate theater, he appeared in many movies and TV shows.

== Broadway ==
The Republic Theatre was the site of Faye's New York stage debut at age 21. During World War II, he entertained Allied military personnel in Africa and Europe as part of a troupe headed by Marlene Dietrich. He was known for having the "fastest sneeze in the West".

Faye played second banana to Phil Silvers in two Broadway shows, High Button Shoes and Top Banana. He also appeared in the 1954 film. In a Broadway career that stretched between the late 1930s and the early 1990s, he appeared in 17 shows altogether, including Room Service (his Broadway debut) and The Tender Trap. He also appeared in the 1955 movie adaptation, the 1965 revival of Guys and Dolls, and Neil Simon's musical Little Me. Faye was the green grapes in Fruit of the Loom underwear commercials throughout the 1980s.

== Television ==
He appeared as a guest in many TV shows from 1949 through 1984. In 1949 he was the resident comedian on NBC's variety show, Broadway Spotlight. In early 1950 he took over as host of the CBS variety show 54th Street Revue. Later in 1950 he headlined a short-lived CBS variety show, Joey Faye's Frolics, which lasted only two weeks. In 1951 he was a participating actor in an equally short-lived CBS quiz show, Guess Again, which also lasted just two weeks. He had better success co-starring with another former burlesque comedian, Mickey Deems, in a series of low-budget 15-minute comedies produced for television. This syndicated series, Mack & Myer for Hire (1963), had Mack (Deems) and Myer (Faye), traveling by motorcycle with sidecar, and hiring themselves out as general help. They would attempt various assignments (carpentry, plumbing, bricklaying, etc.) earnestly but clumsily.

In the 1980s, Joey Faye worked with Benny Hill in a series of sketches produced for home video.

== Personal life ==
Faye was married three times—to Eileen Jenkins, Ginna Carr, and Judy Carlin. He once lived in Great Kills, Staten Island.

== Death ==
Faye died in Englewood, New Jersey, on April 26, 1997. He was 87 years old.

== Filmography ==
=== Film ===
- Close-Up (1948) - Roger
- Let's Do It Again (1953) - Party Guest (uncredited)
- Top Banana (1954) - Pinky
- The Tender Trap (1955) - Sol Z. Steiner
- Street of Sinners (1957) - Pete
- Hear Me Good (1957) - Charlie Cooper
- Sing, Boy, Sing (1958) - Mr. Baron (uncredited)
- Ten North Frederick (1958) - Taxi Driver (uncredited)
- The 30 Foot Bride of Candy Rock (1959) - Booster (uncredited)
- North to Alaska (1960) - Miner / Artist (uncredited)
- The Wizard of Baghdad (1960) - Coutiere (uncredited)
- That Touch of Mink (1962) - Short Man
- For Love or Money (1963) - Bread Shopper on 16mm Film
- Diary of a Bachelor (1964) - Bachelor
- Dead Heat on a Merry-Go-Round (1966) - Joe (uncredited)
- Penelope (1966) - Spectator (uncredited)
- How to Succeed in Business Without Really Trying (1967) - Taxi Driver (uncredited)
- The Night They Raided Minsky's (1967) - Professor Spats (body double for the deceased Bert Lahr in select scenes, uncredited)
- No Way to Treat a Lady (1968) - Caretaker (uncredited)
- What's So Bad About Feeling Good? (1968) - Zookeeper (uncredited)
- The Grissom Gang (1971) - Woppy
- The War Between Men and Women (1972) - Delivery Boy
- The Front (1976) - Waiter
- Once Upon a Time in America (1984) - Adorable Old Man (final film role)

=== Television ===
- The Jerry Lewis Show (1960 NBC solo special in color) - Himself
- Straightaway (1961, episode "The Bribe") - Kinette
- The Danny Thomas Show (1961) - Guest appearance as "Doodles" Faye
- Late Night with David Letterman (1991) - Charles Grodin's attorney
- Beyond Vaudeville (1992 - episode 49) - Himself
