= Top Banana (film) =

1954 film by Alfred E. Green

- Theatrical release poster
- Directed by: Alfred E. Green
- Written by: Gene Towne
- Based on: Top Banana (stage musical) by Johnny Mercer and Hy S. Kraft
- Produced by: Albert Zugsmith
- Starring: Phil Silvers
- Cinematography: William Bradford
- Edited by: Terry O. Morse
- Music by: Johnny Mercer (music); Hy Kraft (lyrics); Bill Finnigan (add'l songs)
- Production company: Roadshow Productions
- Distributed by: United Artists
- Release date: January 27, 1954 (US)
- Running time: 100 minutes
- Country: United States
- Language: English
- Budget: $150,000

Top Banana is a 1954 American musical film based on the musical of the same name, starring Phil Silvers, and featuring Rose Marie, Judy Lynn, Jack Albertson and Joey Faye, all of whom reprised their roles from the Broadway production of the musical.

The film was shot in 3-D but was released by United Artists "flat".

== Plot ==
In New York City in the early 1950s, Jerry Biffle is the star of the Blendo Soap Program. He has been invited to participate in an autograph-signing party for his new book at an important department store. He meets Sally Peters, one of the department store models, and makes her part of his TV troupe. As part of his campaign to court Sally, Jerry gets Cliff Lane, the tenor of his TV company, to sing to her over the phone. When Sally and Cliff meet, they fall in love, with Biffle ignorant of the complications.

Biffle engineers a big publicity wedding between Cliff and "a girl", not knowing that Sally is the girl. To further complicate his life, Jerry learns that he is about to lose his sponsor. The publicity elopement between his girl and Cliff almost shatters his entire career and life.

When it seems that his whole world will cave in, Jerry's sponsor comes up with a new format for the Blendo program and, as far as Jerry is concerned, the day is saved.

== Cast ==
- Phil Silvers as Jerry Biffle
- Rose Marie as Betty Dillon
- Danny Scholl as Cliff Lane
- Judy Lynn as Sally Peters
- Jack Albertson as Vic Davis
- Bradford Hatton as Mr. Parker
- Johnny Coy as Tommy Phelps
- Dick Dana as Danny
- Joey Faye as Pinky
- Johnny Trama as Little Man
- Herbie Faye as Moe
- Walter Darewahl as Walter
- Gloria Smith as featured dancer
- George Marcy as featured dancer
- Grace Lee Whitney as Miss Holland (uncredited)

== Production ==
After concluding its successful engagement on Broadway in 1952, Top Banana went on tour for a year playing in major cities across the country. Phil Silvers and the cast finished their successful run at the Biltmore Theatre in downtown Los Angeles. During that engagement, Harry Popkin negotiated with producers Albert Zugsmith (Touch of Evil, The Incredible Shrinking Man) and Ben Peskay to film the show exactly as it had been presented on stage in sold-out performances across the country. The company packed up the sets and costumes and moved to the Motion Picture Center Studios in Hollywood, where a mock theater "stage" set was built.

The film was shot over five days.

Zugsmith and Peskey decided to film it in 3-D, the popular trend at the time, with the idea in mind that this approach would give the entire audience a choice seat at a top Broadway show, for merely the price of a movie ticket. Zugsmith envisioned this format as a new way to inexpensively film stage shows, and present them in theaters across the country.

The crew developed a rather complicated tracking shot for the opening of the film. The camera would be the person approaching the theater. It would go to the box office and buy tickets, enter the lobby and proceed down to a seat in the third row, center stage. The lights would dim, the overture would play and the show would begin. This elaborate opening was abandoned in favor of a static shot of the theater marquee, which then dissolves directly into the stage show.

Top Banana was photographed with Natural Vision cameras in July 1953, the same rigs that filmed the trend-setting Bwana Devil, as well as other popular 3-D pictures such as House of Wax, Fort Ti, The Charge at Feather River, Devil's Canyon, The Moonlighter, Southwest Passage, and Gog. Unfortunately for the producers, the film was in post-production in September 1953 just as The Robe and CinemaScope hit theaters, and 3-D was starting to decline at the box office.

While shopping the property around for a distributor, the producers announced they would release the film in a flat version only, citing the public's declining interest in stereoscopic films. In early December, they signed a distribution deal with United Artists. Later that month, the success of some new 3-D releases prompted UA to announce in the trades that a 3-D version would, in fact, be available for exhibitors. This is the only reference to any release of the stereoscopic version of the film.

When it was sneak-previewed, shown to the trade publications, and released in February 1954, it was shown in the "flat" version only.

Phil Silvers said of the film:

There was so little money that "Top Banana" was shot in a day and a half. [The director] just pointed the camera and let it roll. He didn't dare stop. In the final cut, you could see a stage hand walking behind a drop. The sound quivered and faded, and yet it managed to pick up every off camera shoe squeak. The 3-D process was obsolete by the time the picture was released, so the 3-D film was projected on regular two-dimensional machines. This left all sort of strange vertical blurs. But the comedy was still there. Somewhere. I made nothing out of the picture. "Top Banana" is occasionally shown on the TV too-late shows, which adds a little blur of their own. The young film buffs who stay up all night consider it a collector's item. With its out of sync sound, inexplicable noises, scenes that seem to be underwater, it's now avant-garde.

All of Rose Marie's musical numbers were excised from the final cut of the film. In 2017, she stated that a producer had made sexual overtures to her, and that when she sharply retorted, the offended producer cut out all of her songs. By her testimony it was the only time she experienced any form of sexual harassment during her 90-year career in the entertainment industry.

The film was not financially successful upon its release.

== Reception ==
The New York Times review praised Silvers above all else: "If the comic, Phil Silvers, weren't in it, it would be unspeakable. As it is, this movie reproduction of the Broadway musical is about as cheap-looking as a picture as this qualified judge has ever seen. The sets and costumes are shoddy, the color is band, the production is absurd. They say it was photographed in two weeks. It looks as though it was done in two days. But, then, Mr. Silvers is in it, repeating the herculean role of the ex-burlesque TV performer which he created on the state. And the sheer competency of his clowning, driving and plunging under a full head of steam and spewing gags like hot cinders, is enough to redeem the film. It is not a particularly glorious or instructive gent that he plays. His clown is a man of viperish instincts and elephantine conceit. He browbeats his retinue of gag-men, he shamelessly exploits his girls and he brashly attempts to ride roughshod over anyone that might get in is way. But he's a devilishly picturesque fellow, amusing to watch from afar. He is the 'top banana.' He is, indeed the whole film."

== Preservation ==
The film was photographed in Eastmancolor, and processed by the Color Corporation of America laboratory in Burbank, California. The lab went out of business the following year. Although unconfirmed, it is presumed that all of the original elements were junked at that time. The negatives were labeled under the production company name, Roadshow Productions.

The only material in the MGM/UA library today is an edited 16mm release print of one side (missing about 15 minutes of footage depicting the rehearsal for the introduction of "Miss Blendo"). This is the version which has been released on home video. No original elements of the film are known to exist. It is the only 3-D film lost in the original stereoscopic form. The edited footage does survive in several 16mm prints struck in 1954.

== See also ==
- List of incomplete or partially lost films
