= Jack Albertson =

American actor (1907-1981)

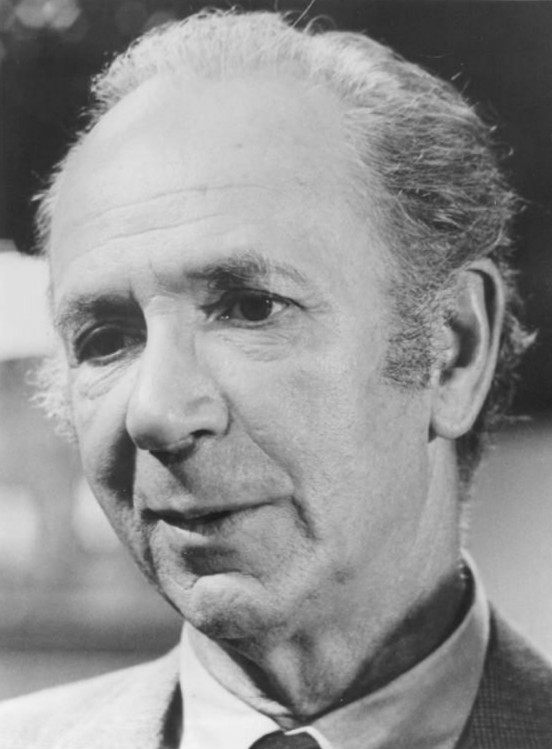
- Albertson in 1971
- Born: Harold Albertson; June 16, 1907; Malden, Massachusetts, U.S.
- Died: November 25, 1981 (aged 74); Los Angeles, California, U.S.
- Other name: John Alberts
- Occupations: Actor; dancer; singer; comedian
- Years active: 1926–1981
- Spouse: June Wallace Thomson (m. 1952)
- Children: 1
- Relatives: Mabel Albertson (sister); George Englund (nephew)

Harold "Jack" Albertson (June 16, 1907 – November 25, 1981) was an American actor, comedian, dancer and singer who also performed in vaudeville. Albertson was a Tony, Oscar, and Emmy winning actor, which ranks him among a rare stature of 24 actors who have been awarded the "Triple Crown of Acting".

For his performance as John Cleary in the 1964 play The Subject Was Roses and its 1968 film adaptation, he won the Tony Award for Best Featured Actor in a Play, and the Academy Award for Best Supporting Actor. This again places him among a select status as one of eleven peers who have won both awards for the same role. His other roles include Grandpa Joe in Willy Wonka & the Chocolate Factory (1971), Manny Rosen in The Poseidon Adventure (1972), and Ed Brown in the television sitcom Chico and the Man (1974–1978), for which he won an Emmy. For his contributions to the television industry, Albertson was honored with a star on the Hollywood Walk of Fame in 1977 at 6253 Hollywood Boulevard.

== Early life ==
Albertson was born on June 16, 1907, in Malden, Massachusetts, the son of Russian-Jewish immigrants Flora (née Craft) and Leopold Albertson. His older sister was actress Mabel Albertson. Their mother, a stock actress, supported the family by working in a shoe factory. Until the age of 22, Albertson was known as "Harold Albertson".

During a 1972 New York Daily News interview with Sidney Fields, Albertson reminisced:

"I was bright but disruptive. I didn't do homework. To cover, I made wisecracks and funny faces at the teachers. They told me to take my business elsewhere."

When he was eighteen, he began to be paid for his prize winning shows. His sister Mabel taught him the first "time steps" in tap dancing, and he picked up additional routines by watching vaudeville acts that played his hometown. Around this time, he started singing with a group called "The Golden Rule Four," who held their practice sessions beneath a railroad bridge.

== Career ==
=== Broadway ===
Albertson joined the vaudeville road troupe known as the Dancing Verselle Sisters. He then worked in burlesque as a hoofer (soft shoe dancer) and straight man to Phil Silvers on the Minsky's Burlesque Circuit. Besides vaudeville and burlesque, he appeared on the stage in many Broadway plays and musicals, including High Button Shoes, Top Banana, The Cradle Will Rock, Make Mine Manhattan, Show Boat, Boy Meets Girl, Girl Crazy, Meet the People, The Sunshine Boys – for which he received a Tony Award nomination for Best Actor, and The Subject Was Roses – for which he won a Tony for Best Supporting Actor.

=== Film ===
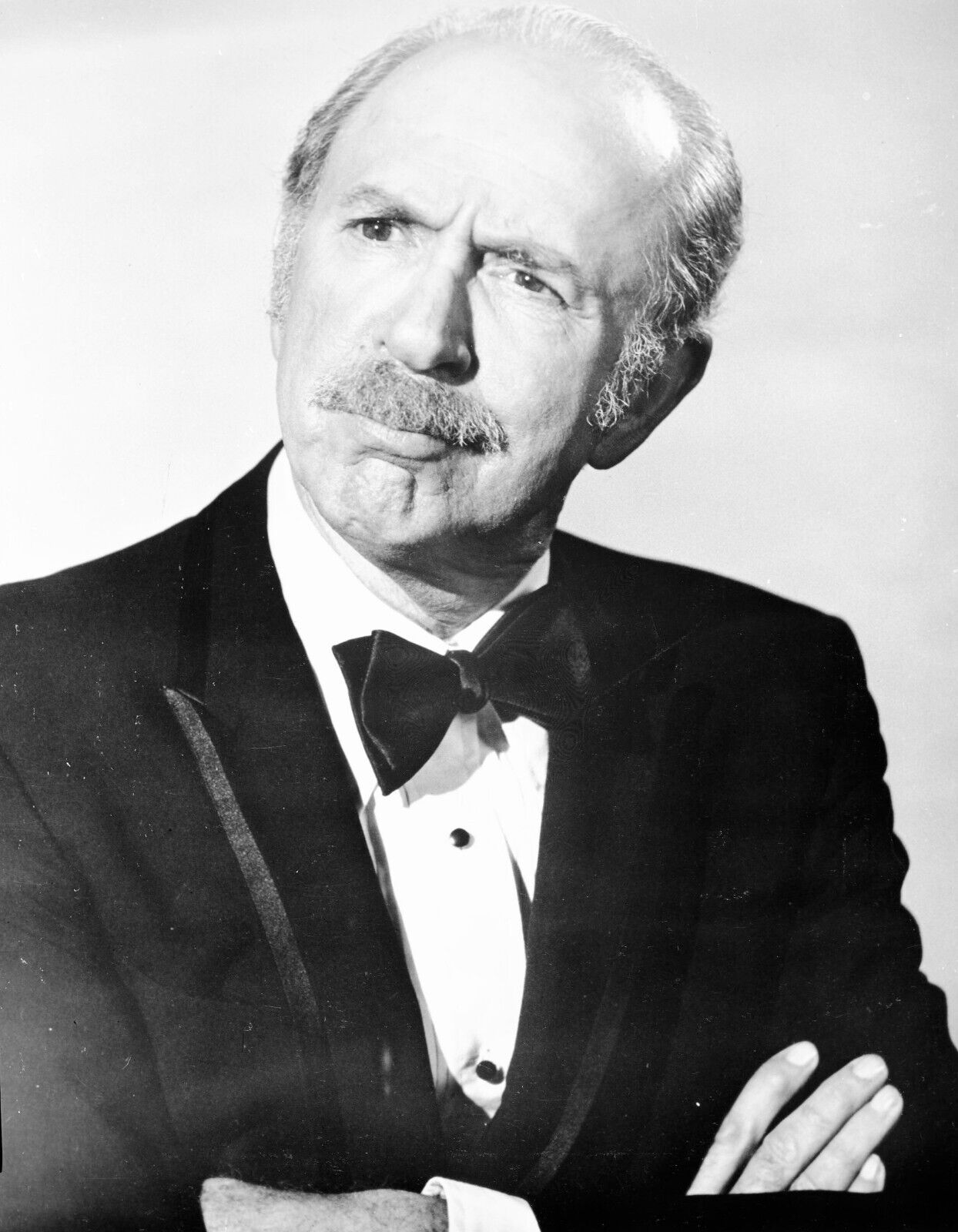
Albertson posing for The Poseidon Adventure in 1972

Albertson appeared in more than 30 films. He had an early minor role in Miracle on 34th Street as a postal worker who redirects dead letters addressed to "Santa Claus" to the courthouse where Kris Kringle's sanity hearing is held. He won an Academy Award for Best Supporting Actor for his role in the 1968 film The Subject Was Roses.

Albertson appeared as Charlie Bucket's Grandpa Joe in Willy Wonka & the Chocolate Factory (1971), and in The Poseidon Adventure (1972), where he played Manny Rosen.

Albertson said that his one regret was that he did not reprise his role in the movie version of The Sunshine Boys. When producer Ray Stark acquired the film rights from Neil Simon in 1973, Albertson was expected to play the part, but by the time MGM had bought the rights in 1974 and was preparing to begin filming in February 1975, Albertson was not available because he was appearing on Chico and the Man on TV.

=== Radio ===
Albertson was a radio performer early in his career. Among the shows he appeared on were Just Plain Bill, Lefty, That's My Pop and The Jack Albertson Comedy Show. In the late 1940s he was for a time a regular on the Milton Berle Show.

=== Television ===
Albertson had a recurring role as the neighbor Walter Burton in eight episodes of the 1962 ABC sitcom Room for One More, with Andrew Duggan and Peggy McCay. He had recurring roles in Ensign O'Toole (1962–63).

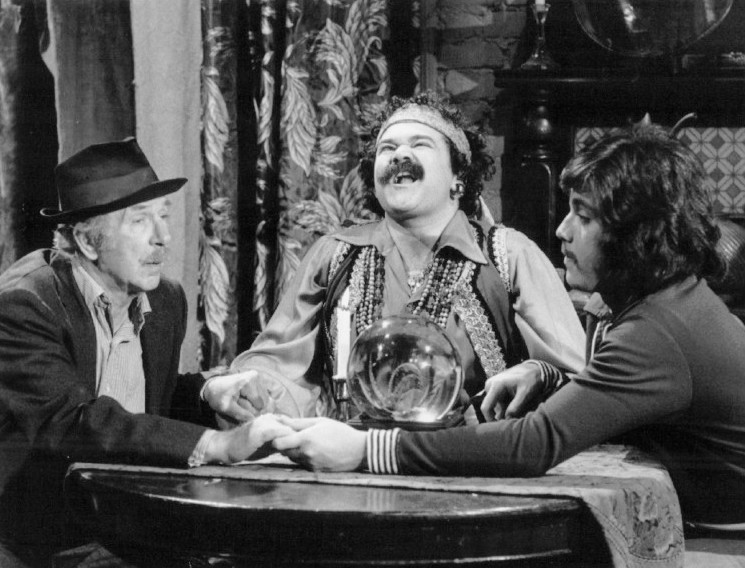
Albertson, Avery Schreiber, and Freddie Prinze on Chico and the Man (1975)

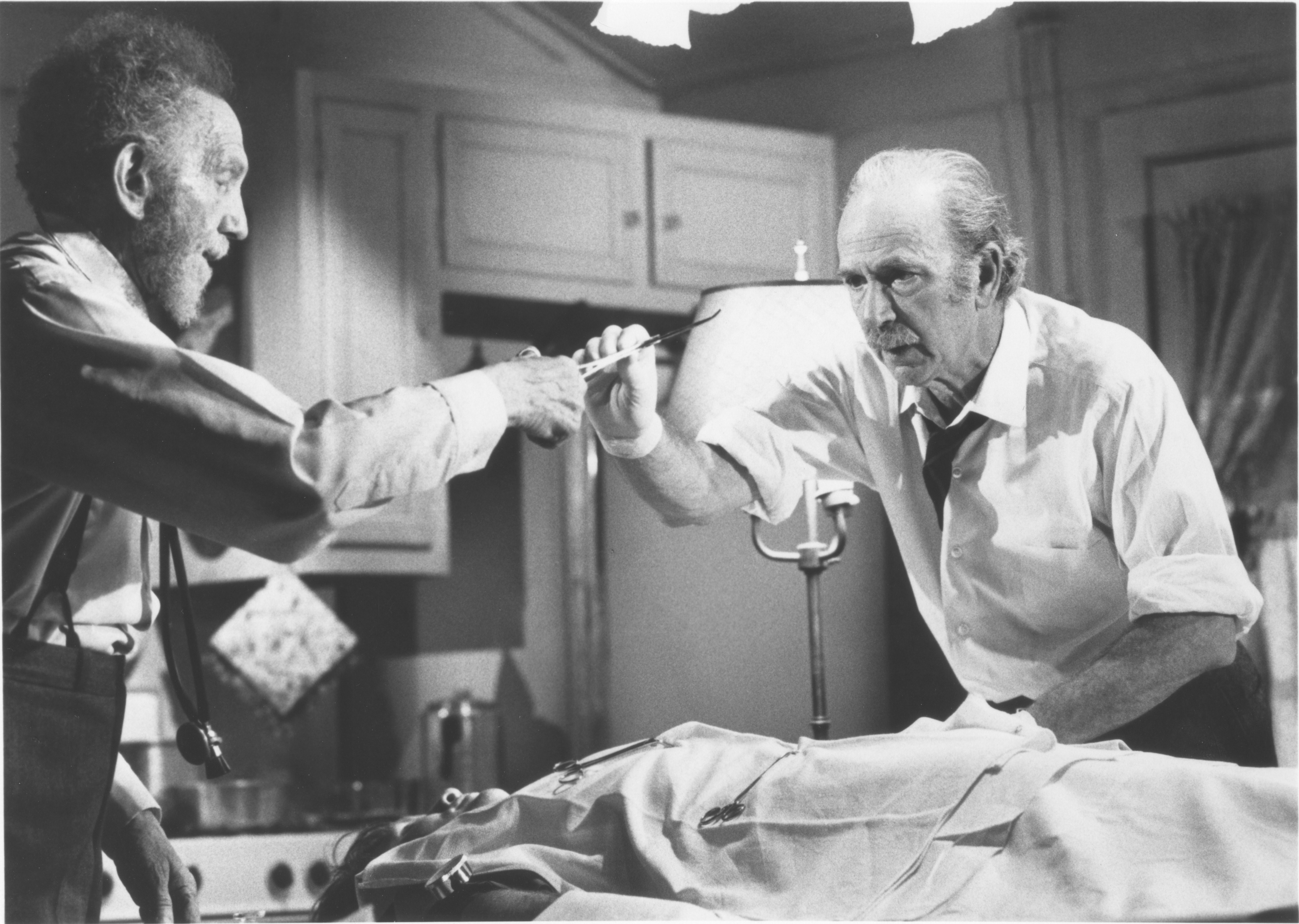
Sam Jaffe (left) and Albertson in the 1976 TV special The Sad and Lonely Sundays

Other 1960s series on which Albertson appeared were: NBC's sitcom Happy, starring Ronnie Burns, and Glynis, starring Glynis Johns, and Keith Andes, which aired for 13 weeks in the fall of 1963. Albertson appeared in two episodes of The Twilight Zone.

From 1971 to 1972, he co-starred, with actor Sam Groom, in the Canadian TV series Dr. Simon Locke. He then co-starred as "The Man" Ed Brown on the popular series Chico and the Man with Freddie Prinze. He stayed for its entire run from 1974 to 1978. He earned an Emmy Award for that role in 1976, which was his second; his first was for an appearance on the variety show Cher in 1975.

== Personal life ==
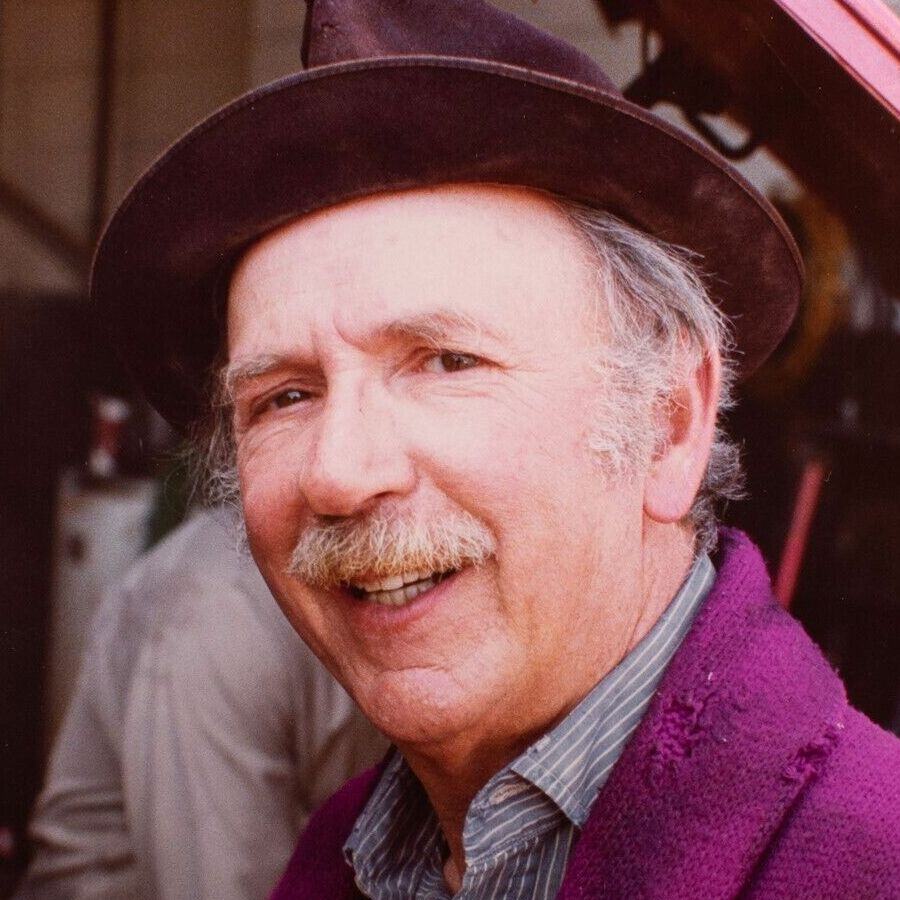
Albertson in 1974

He and his wife, Wallace, had one daughter, Maura Dhu, who is married to actor Wes Studi.

== Death ==
On the morning of November 25, 1981, Albertson died at his Los Angeles home in the Hollywood Hills at the age of 74 from colon cancer. He and his elder sister, Bewitched actress Mabel Albertson (who died 10 months later from Alzheimer's disease), were cremated and their ashes were scattered in the Pacific Ocean.

== Filmography ==
=== Film ===
Year	Title	Role	Notes
1938	Next Time I Marry	Reporter	
1940	Strike Up the Band	Barker	Uncredited
1947	Miracle on 34th Street	Al	Uncredited
1952	Anything Can Happen	Flower Vendor	Uncredited
1954	Top Banana	Vic Davis	
1955	Bring Your Smile Along	Mr. Jenson	
1956	Over-Exposed	Les Bauer	
1956	The Harder They Fall	Pop	
1956	The Eddy Duchin Story	Piano tuner	Uncredited
1956	The Unguarded Moment	Prof	
1956	You Can't Run Away from It	Third proprietor	
1957	Monkey on My Back	Sam Pian	
1957	Man of a Thousand Faces	Dr. J. Wilson Shields	
1957	Don't Go Near the Water	Rep. George Jansen	
1958	Teacher's Pet	Guide	
1959	Never Steal Anything Small	Sleep-Out Charlie Barnes	
1959	The Shaggy Dog	Reporter	Uncredited
1961	The George Raft Story	Milton	
1961	Lover Come Back	Fred	
1962	Convicts 4	Art Teacher	
1962	Period of Adjustment	Desk Sergeant	
1962	Who's Got the Action?	Officer Hodges	
1962	Days of Wine and Roses	Trayner	
1963	Son of Flubber	Mr. Barley	
1964	Kissin' Cousins	Capt. Robert Jason Salbo	
1964	A Tiger Walks	Sam Grant	
1964	The Patsy	Theatergoer with Helen	
1964	Roustabout	Lou (tea house manager)	
1965	How to Murder Your Wife	Dr. Bentley	
1967	The Flim-Flam Man	Mr. Packard	
1968	How to Save a Marriage and Ruin Your Life	Mr. Slotkin	
1968	The Subject Was Roses	John Cleary	Academy Award for Best Supporting Actor
1969	Changes	The Father	
1969	Justine	Cohen	
1970	Squeeze a Flower	Alfredo Brazzi	
1970	Rabbit, Run	Marty Tothero	
1971	Willy Wonka & the Chocolate Factory	Grandpa Joe Bucket	
1971	The Late Liz	Reverend Gordon Rogers	
1972	Pickup on 101	Jedediah Bradley	
1972	The Poseidon Adventure	Manny Rosen	
1981	Dead & Buried	William G. Dobbs	
1981	The Fox and the Hound	Amos Slade	Voice

=== Television ===
Year	Title	Role	Notes
1956	Burns and Allen	Eddie 'Bozo Schultz' Wilson	Episode: "Burlesque"
1956	I Love Lucy	Helicopter Dispatcher	Episode: "Bon Voyage"
1956	Crusader	Ernie Duchek	Episode: "The Syndicate"
1956	Sheriff of Cochise	Greenbriar Merritt	Episode: "Closed for Repairs"
1957–1959	The Thin Man	Lt. Harry Evans	14 episodes
1957–1960	Have Gun – Will Travel	Mayor Whiteside, Jason Coldwell, Bookie	3 episodes
1958	Bachelor Father	Charlie Sharpe, Salesman	2 episodes
1958	The People's Choice	Luther Jenkins	Episode: "Daisies Won't Tell", with Jackie Cooper
1959	Richard Diamond, Private Detective	Fallace	Episode: "Boomerang Bait"
1959–1961	The Many Loves of Dobie Gillis	Bison Lodge Member, Police Sergeant, Newspaper Reporter, Mr. Quimby, Police chief	5 episodes
1959–1962	The Jack Benny Program	Reporter	6 episodes
1960	The Gale Storm Show	Freddy Morell	Episode: "Show Biz"
1960	The Tab Hunter Show	Coach	Episode: "My Darling Teacher"
1960	The Ann Sothern Show	Mr. Dooley	Episode: "Billy"
1960	Happy	Ed Langley	Episode: "Chris' Night Out"
1960	Klondike	Eskimo Eddie	Episode: "Sure Thing, Men"
1961	Riverboat	Sampson J. Binton	Episode: "Listen to the Nightingale"'
1961	The Tab Hunter Show	Harry, Dr. Hocker, P. T. Bailey	Episode: "Weekend on Ice"; Episode: "Me and My Shadow"; Episode: "Crazy Over Horses"
1961	The Twilight Zone	Jerry Harlowe	Episode: "The Shelter"
1961–1964	Mister Ed	Paul Fenton	7 episodes
1962	The Dick Van Dyke Show	Mr. Eisenbauer	Episode: "The Twizzle"
1962	Bus Stop	Lawson	Episode: "Turn Home Again"
1962	Lawman	Doc Peters	Episode: "The Unmasked"
1962	Saints and Sinners	Dr. Felixson	Episode: "All the Hard Young Men"
1962	Room for One More	Walter Burton	8 episodes
1962–1963	Ensign O'Toole	Lt. Cdr. Virgil Stoner	32 episodes
1963	Glynis	Al	Episode: "The Pros and Cons"
1963	The Twilight Zone	The Genie	Episode: "I Dream of Genie"
1963	The Lieutenant	District Attorney George O'Leery	Episode: "Cool of the Evening"
1964	Death Valley Days	Pearlman	Episode: "Sixty-Seven Miles of Gold"
1966–1967	Run for Your Life	Harry Krissel	2 episodes
1967	The Andy Griffith Show	Bradford J. Taylor	Episode: "Aunt Bee's Cousin"
1968–1970	Ironside	Money Howard, Sgt. Dave Spangler	Episode: "Side Pocket" "Blackout"
1968	Here Come the Brides	role as Merlin	S1, E10 "A Man and His Magic"
1968–1972	Bonanza	Jonathan May, Enos Blessing	2 episodes
1969	The Big Valley	Judge Ben Moore	Episode: "The Battle of Mineral Springs"
1969	The Monk	Tinker	ABC Movie of the Week
1969–1970	Land of the Giants	Professor Kirmus, Inidu	2 episodes
1969–1970	The Virginian	Billy "Moose" Valentine, Nathaniel E. "Doc" Watson	2 episodes
1969–1974	Gunsmoke	Moses Darby, Joshua Finch, Lucius Prince, Danny Wilson	4 episodes
1970	Marcus Welby, M.D.	Mr. Chambers	Episode: "Go Get 'Em, Tiger"
1970	The Immortal	Dr. Koster	Episode: "Reflections on a Lost Tomorrow"
1970	Daniel Boone	Sweet	Episode: "Run for the Money"
1970	Nanny and the Professor	Edwin Higgenbotham Botkin	Episode: "The Haunted House"
1971	Sarge	Harry Wainwright	Episode: "A Terminal Case of Vengeance"
1971	Love, American Style	Archie	Segment: "Love and the Second Time"
1971	Congratulations, It's a Boy!	Al Gaines	ABC Movie of the Week
1971–1972	Dr. Simon Locke	Dr. Andrew Sellers	
1972	Night Gallery	Bullivant	Episode: "Dead Weight"
1973	The Streets of San Francisco	Tim Murphy	Episode: "The Set-Up"
1974	Gunsmoke	Moses Darby	Episode: "Cowtown Hustler" S19E22 Aired on May 11, 1974
1974–1978	Chico and the Man	Ed Brown	88 episodes Primetime Emmy Award for Outstanding Lead Actor in a Comedy Series (1976); Nominated – Primetime Emmy Award for Outstanding Lead Actor in a Comedy Series (1975, 1977)
1975	Tony Orlando and Dawn	Himself	Episode: #1.20
1975	Mitzi and 100 Guys	Himself	TV movie
1975	Cher	Himself	Episode: "Episode #1.4"; Primetime Emmy Award for Outstanding Continuing or Single Performance by a Supporting Actor in Variety or Music
1975	Match Game '75	Himself	5 episodes
1976	Donny & Marie	Himself	1 Episode dated April 6, 1976
1976	Andy	Himself	1 Episode dated October 6, 1976
1976	The Sad and Lonely Sundays	Dr. George Sorenson	TV special written by Rod Serling
1978	Grandpa Goes to Washington	Senator Joe Kelley	7 episodes
1979	Valentine	Pete Ferguson	TV movie
1980	Charlie's Angels	Edward Jordan	Episode: "Angel in Hiding"
1981	Charlie and the Great Balloon Chase	Charlie Bartlett	TV movie
1982	My Body, My Child	Poppa MacMahon	TV movie; filmed in 1981; released posthumously; final television role Nominated – Primetime Emmy Award for Outstanding Supporting Actor in a Limited Series or a Special
1982	Terror at Alcatraz	George 'Deacon' Wheeler	TV movie, (final film role)

=== Theater ===
Year	Title	Role	Notes
1940	Meet the People		
1942	Strip for Action	Eddie	
1944	Allah Be Praised!	Caswell / Emir	
1945	A Lady Say Yes	Dr. Bartoli	
1947	High Button Shoes	Mr. Pontdue (replacement)	
1947	The Cradle Will Rock	Yasha	
1950	Tickets, Please!	Roller Derby	
1951	Top Banana	Vic Davis	
1964	The Subject Was Roses	John Cleary	Tony Award for Best Featured Actor in a Play
1972	The Sunshine Boys	Willie Clark	Drama Desk Award for Outstanding Performance; Nominated – Tony Award for Best Leading Actor in a Play

== Awards and nominations ==
Year	Award	Category	Nominated work	Results	Ref.
1968	Academy Awards	Best Supporting Actor	The Subject Was Roses	Won	
1973	Drama Desk Awards	Outstanding Performance	The Sunshine Boys	Won	
1975	Primetime Emmy Awards	Outstanding Continuing or Single Performance by a Supporting Actor in Variety or Music	Cher	Won	
1975	Primetime Emmy Awards	Outstanding Lead Actor in a Comedy Series	Chico and the Man	Nominated	
1976	Primetime Emmy Awards	Outstanding Lead Actor in a Comedy Series	Chico and the Man	Won	
1977	Primetime Emmy Awards	Outstanding Lead Actor in a Comedy Series	Chico and the Man	Nominated	
1982	Primetime Emmy Awards	Outstanding Supporting Actor in a Limited Series or a Special	My Body, My Child	Nominated^{†} (Note: Albertson received this nomination posthumously, having died in '81 prior to those two succeeding '82 events: the television premiere of the film and the subsequent Emmys ceremony.)	
1965	Tony Awards	Best Supporting or Featured Actor in a Play	The Subject Was Roses	Won	
1973	Tony Awards	Best Leading Actor in a Play	The Sunshine Boys	Nominated	

== See also ==
- Triple Crown of Acting
