= Grace Lee Whitney =

American actress and singer (1930–2015)

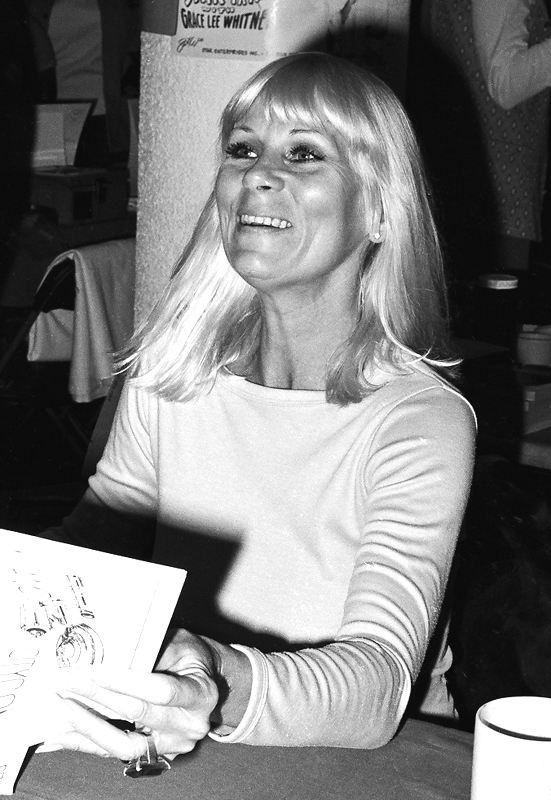
- Grace Lee Whitney at a Star Trek convention (c. 1980)
- Born: Mary Ann Chase; April 1, 1930; Ann Arbor, Michigan, U.S.
- Died: May 1, 2015 (aged 85); Coarsegold, California, U.S.
- Occupations: Actress; singer
- Years active: 1947–2007
- Spouses: Sydney Stevan Dweck (m. 1954; div. 1966); Jack Dale (m. 1970; div. 1991)
- Children: 2

Grace Lee Whitney (prior Grace Elaine Whitney; born Mary Ann Chase, April 1, 1930 – May 1, 2015) was an American actress and singer. Her entertainment career spanned over a half century in a variety of capacities in radio, on stage, in music as a singer and songwriter, in television, and in movies. She played Janice Rand on the original Star Trek television series and subsequent Star Trek films.

== Early life ==
Whitney was born in Ann Arbor, Michigan, and was adopted by the Whitney family, who changed her name to Grace Elaine. The family moved to Detroit, where Whitney attended school. She started her entertainment career as a "girl singer" on Detroit's WJR radio at age 14. After she left home, she began to call herself Lee Whitney, eventually becoming known as Grace Lee Whitney. In her late teens, she moved to Chicago, where she opened in nightclubs for Billie Holiday and Buddy Rich and toured with the Spike Jones and Fred Waring bands. Thereafter, in 1952, she enrolled in nursing school, before returning to performing.

== Early roles ==
=== Radio ===
Whitney was the original Chicken of the Sea mermaid character created in 1952. Chicken of the Sea has maintained the mermaid as its mascot over the years. Whitney came to play the iconic mermaid character while appearing on the Edgar Bergen and Charlie McCarthy Show on CBS Radio, which was broadcast in front of a live studio audience with Whitney in costume and singing the tuna jingle.

=== Theater ===
Whitney debuted at the Winter Garden Theatre on Broadway in Top Banana, with Phil Silvers and Kaye Ballard in 1952, playing Miss Holland. Here she met her future husband, Sydney Stevan Dweck, who was a freelance drummer and percussionist and band member for the show. Following the successful run of the show in New York, she joined the cast in Hollywood, where she recreated the role in the 1954 musical film of the same name.

She was a chorus girl in the off-Broadway musicals Great to be Alive! (1953) and The Pajama Game (1956).

In 1960, while in Los Angeles, Whitney auditioned for and was cast in the starring role of Lucy Brown in the first national tour of The Threepenny Opera, taking over the role from Bea Arthur, who had played the part in New York off-Broadway.

=== Film ===
Her movie debut was in House of Wax (1953) in an uncredited role. Whitney was cast as a member of the all-female band in Billy Wilder's comedy Some Like It Hot (1959). She shared several scenes with Jack Lemmon, Tony Curtis, and Marilyn Monroe, including the "upper berth" sequence. She had uncredited roles in The Naked and the Dead (1958), The Rise and Fall of Legs Diamond (1960), and Pocketful of Miracles (1961). Whitney was credited as Tracey Phillips in the drama A Public Affair (1962) and as Texas Rose in the Western The Man from Galveston (1963). Billy Wilder then gave her the featured role of Kiki the Cossack in Irma la Douce (1963).

=== Television ===
Whitney made more than 100 television appearances following her television dramatic debut in Cowboy G-Men in 1953 (credited as Ruth Whitney.)

She appeared on episodes of The Real McCoys, Wagon Train, The Islanders, Hennesey, The Roaring 20s, Gunsmoke, Bat Masterson, The Rifleman, 77 Sunset Strip, Mike Hammer, Batman, The Untouchables, Hawaiian Eye, The Outer Limits, Bewitched, Mannix, Death Valley Days, The Big Valley, and The Virginian.

During the 1950s and early 1960s, Whitney was a frequent semiregular on over 80 live television shows, including You Bet Your Life hosted by Groucho Marx in 1953, The Red Skelton Show, The Jimmy Durante Show, and The Ernie Kovacs Show, largely appearing in gag sketches. From 1957 to 1958, she appeared as a "Vanna-type adornment" on the popular daytime show Queen for a Day.

== Star Trek ==
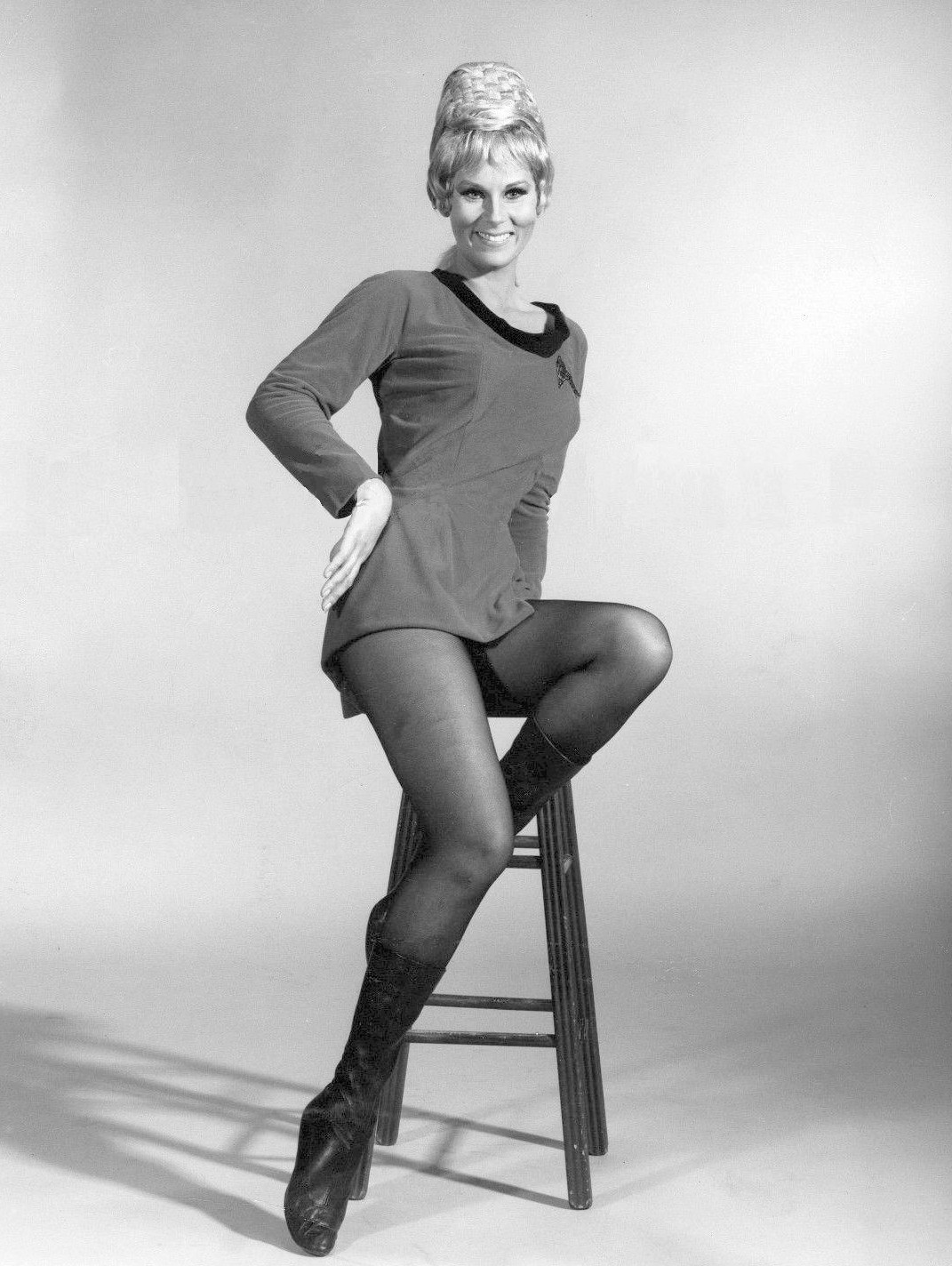
Grace Lee Whitney as Yeoman Janice Rand in Star Trek (1966)

Whitney first met Star Trek creator Gene Roddenberry when she was cast as the female lead Sgt. Lilly Monroe in Roddenberry's TV pilot Police Story, which was filmed just weeks after the second Star Trek pilot in 1965.

Both shows shared many of the same crew, including associate producer Robert H. Justman and executive in charge of production Herbert F. Solow and eventual Star Trek co-star DeForest Kelley. Police Story was not picked up, but Star Trek was. (Police Story was later screened as a TV movie in 1967 along with several other failed pilots; by this time Star Trek was in its second season. The networks again chose not to pick up the show.)

Roddenberry cast Whitney in Star Trek as Yeoman Janice Rand, the personal assistant to Captain James T. Kirk. While the stars of the show were William Shatner (Captain Kirk) and Leonard Nimoy (Mr. Spock), Whitney shared the same billing as DeForest Kelley, who played Dr. McCoy.

On September 1, 1966, one week before the first episode screened on NBC, Whitney, Shatner, and Nimoy were interviewed by Barbara Walters on The Today Show, where they discussed the new show. The first promotional photographs for Star Trek also featured Shatner, Nimoy, and Whitney—separately and together—with preproduction costumes for all and an early version of the "beehive" hairstyle that Whitney's character had in the filmed episodes.

Whitney appeared in eight of the first 15 episodes, after which she was released from her contract. The official reason given for Whitney's departure from the show was that her character limited romantic possibilities for Captain Kirk.

At the time, Whitney was guaranteed to appear in seven of the first 13 episodes and contracted for four days of work on each. However, she was used for nine additional days. On September 8, 1966, also the date of broadcast of the first episode of Star Trek, "The Man Trap", Whitney's agent was informed that her contract had been terminated, which was around a week prior to the shoot of her penultimate episode, "The Conscience of the King". Roddenberry told Whitney that he did not want to lose Rand, as he wanted her relationship with Kirk to continue. In a memorandum to Star Trek showrunner Gene Coon on October 27, 1966, Roddenberry suggested bringing Whitney back as Rand, albeit with a different hairstyle, similar to the one she had in Police Story, as this "made her look much younger and softer", but she was never invited back to the series.

Whitney said that while still under contract, she was sexually assaulted by an executive associated with the series. Later, in a public interview, she stated that Leonard Nimoy had been her main source of support during that time. She went into more details about the assault in her book The Longest Trek, but refused to name the executive, saying in the book, "This is my story, not his."

== After Star Trek ==
Between TV guest spots, Whitney returned to singing and in 1968 opened her own dress-design firm, modeling her own designs while performing. She starred in the 1968 Walt Disney's Wonderful World of Color two-part TV episode "Way Down Cellar".

After marrying her second husband in 1970, Whitney took a break from acting to work on her singing career, while her new husband and she lived at their home in the San Fernando Valley, raising the children along with four Great Dane dogs.

=== Return to Star Trek franchise ===
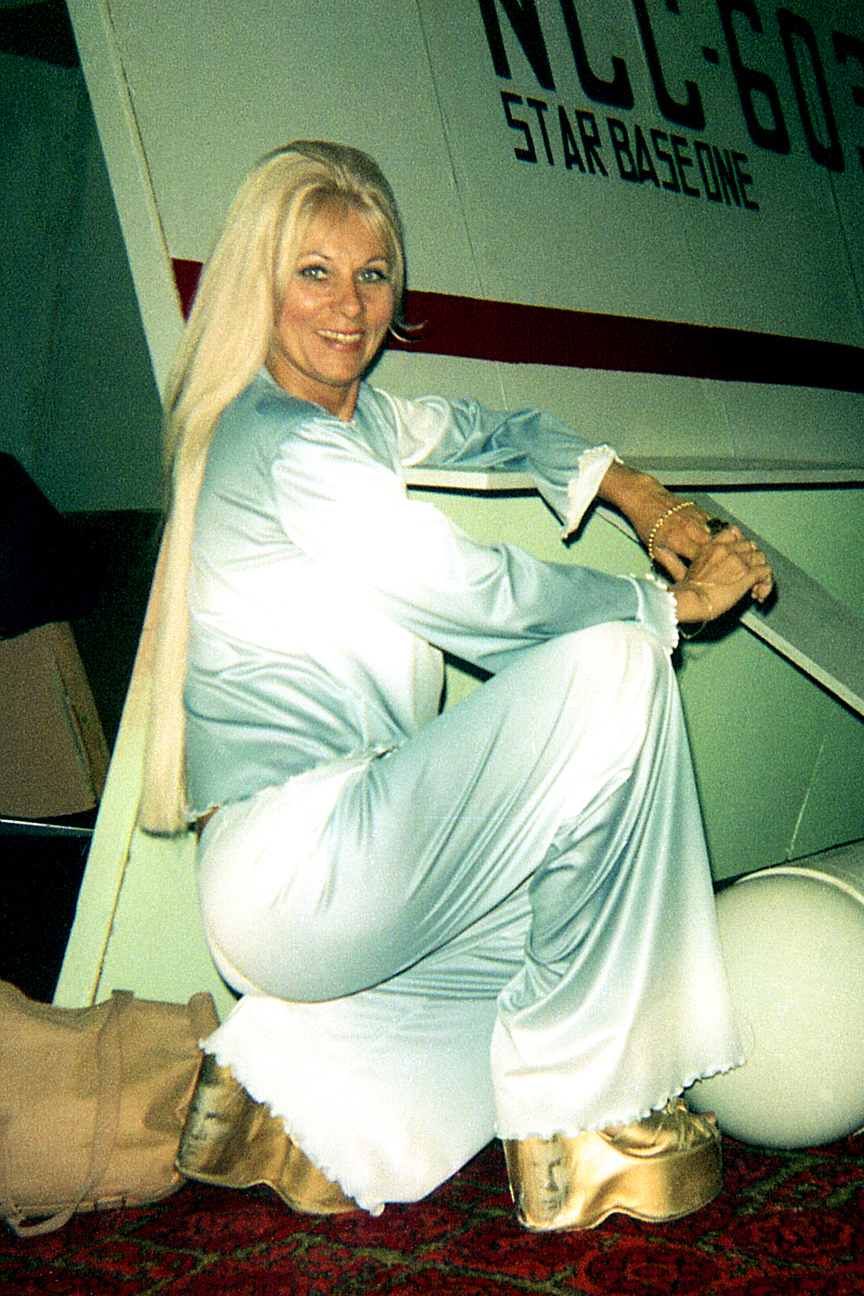
Whitney posing with a Star Trek shuttlecraft prop recreation at a science-fiction convention, 1975

Whitney returned to the Star Trek franchise in the mid-1970s after DeForest Kelley saw Whitney in the unemployment line and told her that fans had been asking for her at fan conventions, which were starting to become regular and numerous in the United States. She attended her first convention, "Equicon-76", in 1976 and was warmly received. She went on to attend Star Trek and science-fiction fan conventions regularly during the 1970s and 1980s, often performing with her band Star.

In the late 1970s, talks arose of Star Trek returning as a new television series, as Star Trek: Phase II. The new series was officially announced on June 10, 1977. Coincidentally, having read the back cover of Susan Sackett's Letters to Star Trek book and discovering that one of the frequently asked questions sent into the production team was "Whatever happened to Grace Lee Whitney?", Whitney herself got in touch with Sackett and was invited along to meet with Roddenberry at his office in Paramount Studios. He had not seen her in over 10 years, so he was excited and happy to see her and immediately offered to bring back the Rand character for Phase II, describing the removal of Rand from The Original Series as his greatest mistake and blaming it on NBC executives.

Despite considerable development, Paramount Pictures changed their minds about the TV series and instead decided on Star Trek returning as a motion picture. Star Trek: The Motion Picture began filming in August 1978 and was released in 1979. Whitney reprised her role as Janice Rand, with a promotion to chief petty officer and in the position of transporter chief.

She also made cameo appearances in subsequent films, Star Trek III: The Search for Spock (1984) and Star Trek IV: The Voyage Home (1986). In Star Trek VI: The Undiscovered Country (1991), she was cast as the communications officer of the USS Excelsior with another promotion, as Lieutenant Commander Janice Rand.

Five years later, to celebrate the 30th anniversary of the franchise, she returned in the 1996 Star Trek: Voyager episode "Flashback", along with George Takei.

Also, Whitney reprised her role in two fan fiction Star Trek productions: Star Trek: New Voyages and Star Trek: Of Gods and Men. New Voyages premiered on August 24, 2007, while Of Gods and Men made its debut in late 2007. The latter was her final screen appearance as a Star Trek character. The fifth episode of fan-produced Star Trek Continues, episode "Divided We Stand" (released September 26, 2015), was dedicated to her "lovely and endearing spirit".

In 2009, Whitney appeared in the British Channel 4 TV film Bring Back... Star Trek with Justin Lee Collins.

Her final screen appearance was in the William Shatner documentary The Captains in 2011.

== Later TV roles ==
Whitney's roles in the 1970s included The Bold Ones, Cannon, The Next Step Beyond, and Hart to Hart. In 1983, she had a small part in the television film The Kid with the 200 I.Q., with Gary Coleman. Her last TV guest appearance was in a 1998 episode of Diagnosis: Murder, which reunited her with her Star Trek colleagues George Takei, Walter Koenig and Majel Barrett.

== Music ==
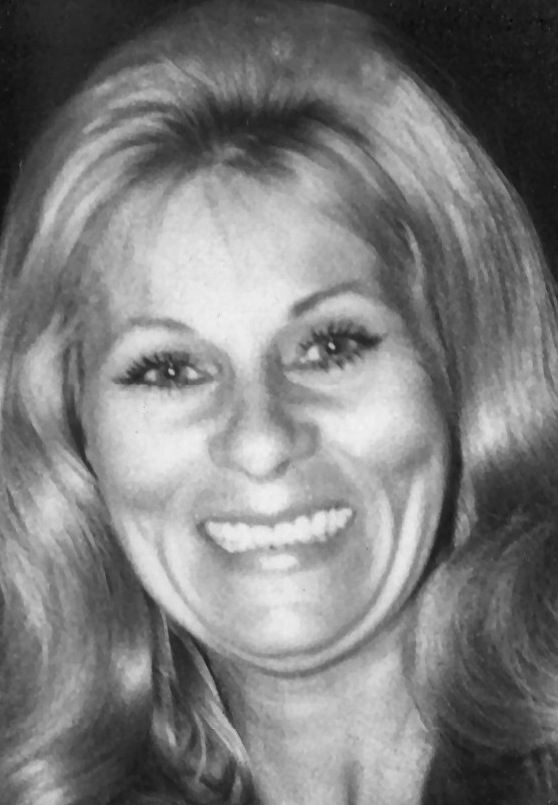
Whitney at the first Science Fiction, Horror and Fantasy Awards, December 5, 1976

In the 1960s and 1970s, she sang with a number of orchestras and bands, including the Keith Williams Orchestra. Later, she concentrated on jazz/pop vocalizing while fronting for the band Star. With acting taking a back seat in the mid 1970s, she performed with her band at Disneyland, bar mitzvahs, private parties, political events, schools and at sci-fi conventions throughout the remainder of the 1970s, while raising her children.

In the mid-1970s, she wrote a number of Star Trek-related songs with her second husband, Jack Dale. A 45 rpm record was released in 1976, on her own label, with the songs "Disco Trekin'" (A side) and "Star Child" (B side).

She recorded such tunes as "Charlie X", "Miri", "Enemy Within", and "USS Enterprise". Many of these songs were released in the 1990s on cassette tape: Light at the End of the Tunnel in 1996 and Yeoman Rand Sings! in 1999.

== Autobiography ==
Whitney's autobiography, The Longest Trek: My Tour of the Galaxy, was released in 1998 (ISBN 1-884956-05-X). Along with her hiring and firing from Star Trek, the book recounts her work as the first Chicken of the Sea mermaid and her struggles with and eventual recovery from alcohol and substance abuse.

== Personal life and death ==
Whitney's first husband, Sydney Steven Dweck, was a freelance drummer, whom she met while on Broadway in the 1950s. They married in 1954. Dweck, a Sephardic Jew, asked Whitney to convert to Judaism to marry him. They had two sons. She divorced her first husband in 1966 and married her second husband, Jack Dale, in 1970. In her autobiography, she claimed she had relationships with Buzz Aldrin and Harlan Ellison while still legally married to her second husband.

Whitney got involved in alcohol and drugs from the age of 13 and struggled with these addictions throughout her career and life. Whitney's addictions spiraled after leaving Star Trek. During the filming of Star Trek: The Motion Picture, she attempted to get sober but "switched addictions from booze to marijuana." In the early 1980s, after her divorce from her second husband, Whitney resumed drinking and doing drugs.

In a 2011 interview with StarTrek.com, Whitney recounted her battle with alcohol and drug abuse during the 1970s and the courage and strength she displayed to eventually overcome those addictions:

"... And I just about killed myself over that reject [being fired from Star Trek.] And when I would go on interviews, I would smell of alcohol. I was very Lindsay Lohan-ish, very Charlie Sheen. I was lost. I was lost and I began to bottom out. It took me about 10 years after getting written out to come to my senses, when I bottomed out."
...And bottoming out means I was sick and tired of being sick and tired and I had to get help. What happened was that I was down on Skid Row, on 6th and Main in L.A., looking for my lower companions to get some kind of help, when I was 12-stepped down there by a man from the Midnight Mission ... who is a guru in the 12-step program. His sponsee helped me get to my first 12-step meeting where God absolutely delivered me. There was no question. I could not not drink. I was using a lot of drugs from Dr. Feelgood. A lot of actors used the amphetamines from Dr. Feelgood to stay skinny, to function. It's just insidious. Once you get into the drinking and using, it's almost impossible to get out without the grace of God, which is what I give my credit to. Leonard Nimoy (who is also a recovering alcoholic) was so moved that he (later) wrote the foreword to my book. But that's how I began my recovery and my trek back to the studio to make amends, to do everything I've had to do there.

With the help of the 12-step program she became sober in 1981.

"...Well, I had the sexual assault from someone at Desilu, which I found out later was done by a lot of producers (during that era). It was before the sexual assault law came into being. I was one of the ones that was a victim. I was fired from the show, but I found later that it was in the works before the assault. I'd been blaming the assault for most of my life, until ... when I got sober."

Several years later, following a trip to Israel, Whitney became a born again Christian. In a 1995 issue of TV Guide, Whitney described her road to recovery with her new-found faith:

I committed my life to Jesus and began to journey back. The high I looked for in drugs and alcohol I eventually found in Jesus Christ....
Many people think they can be totally recovered from addictions if they have Jesus Christ. They think that is going to make them new and take away their addictions. I really do not think that is possible. I think God has taken away my alcoholism today. He has taken away my addictions today. But I have to start new every day. I have to start the 12 steps every day. I have to commit my life to him every day.

Whitney dedicated the remainder of her life to helping others overcome addiction and was a leading worker with others in Alcoholics Anonymous. She has spoken in churches, organizations, prisons, and media conventions. She moved to Coarsegold, California, in 1993 to be close to a son, also a Christian, and she "continued her fellowship work in Fresno and Madera counties."

Whitney died of natural causes at her home in Coarsegold on May 1, 2015, at age 85.

One of her sons said his mother wanted to be known more as a survivor of addiction than as a Star Trek cast member.

== Filmography ==
Year	Title	Role	Notes
1952	Cowboy G-Men	Saloon girl	Episode "Hangfire" (as Ruth Whitney)
1953	House of Wax	Can-Can Dancer	Uncredited (as Ruth Whitney)
1954	Top Banana	Miss Holland	Uncredited
1958	The Naked and the Dead	Girl in Dream Sequence	Uncredited
1958	The Walter Winchell File	Midge	Episode: "Night People" (as Lee Whitney)
1958	The Life and Legend of Wyatt Earp	Saloon girl	Episode "Kill The Editor" (as Ruth Whitney)
1959	Some Like It Hot	Rosella	Uncredited
1960	The Rise and Fall of Legs Diamond	Flashily dressed girl	Uncredited
1961	Bat Masterson	Louise Talbot	Episode "The Good & The Bad"
1961	Pocketful of Miracles	Queenie's 'Broad' in Black Dress	Uncredited
1961	77 Sunset Strip	April	TV Series, 5 episodes
1962	A Public Affair	Tracey Phillips	An expository internal affairs drama film
1962	The Rifleman	Rose	Season 4 Episode 24 "Tinhorn"
1962	Death Valley Days	Verna	Season 10 Episode 21 "The Breaking Point"
1962	Death Valley Days	Della	Season 11 Episode 6 "The Last Shot"
1963	The Virginian	Nina	Season 1 Episode 26 "Echo of Another Day"
1963	Critic's Choice	Minor role	
1963	The Man from Galveston	Texas Rose	TV series, 1 episode
1963	Irma la Douce	Kiki the Cossack	
1964	The Outer Limits	Carla Duveen	Episode "Controlled Experiment" (Only comedy episode of The Outer Limits)
1964	Bewitched	Babs Livingston	Season 1 Episode 3 "It Shouldn't Happen to a Dog"
1964	Death Valley Days	Kate Fisher	Season 12 Episode 24 "The Quiet and the Fury"
1966	Star Trek	Yeoman Janice Rand	TV series, 8 episodes
1967	Batman	Neila	Episodes "King Tut's Coup" and "Batman's Waterloo"
1967	Rango	Girl	Episode "My Teepee Runneth Over"
1968	Mannix	Gloria	Episode "Another Final Exit"
1968	Walt Disney's Wonderful World of Color	Velma	"Way Down Cellar" (2-part episode)
1968	Cimarron Strip	Katie	Episode "Knife in the Darkness"
1968	Death Valley Days	Angela Cummings	Season 16 Episode 26 "Tall Heart, Short Temper"
1969	The Outsider	Claire	Episode: "The Secrets of Marengo Bay" (S01E15)
1969	Death Valley Days	Nellie Cashman	Season 17 Episode 19 "Angel of Tombstone"
1974	Cannon	Ida	Episode: "The Deadly Trail" (S4E5)
1978	The Next Step Beyond	Dr. Dorothy Alsworth	Episode "The Confession" (S01E23)
1979	Star Trek: The Motion Picture	Janice Rand	Transporter Operator
1984	Star Trek III: The Search for Spock	Janice Rand	Woman in Cafeteria
1986	Star Trek IV: The Voyage Home	Janice Rand	Starfleet Communications Officer
1991	Star Trek VI: The Undiscovered Country	Janice Rand	Excelsior Communications Officer
1996	Star Trek: Voyager	Janice Rand	TV series, 1 episode
2007	Star Trek: New Voyages	Janice Rand	Star Trek fan web series, 1 episode
2007	Star Trek: Of Gods and Men	Janice Rand	Star Trek fan film (final film role)
2009	Bring Back... Star Trek	Herself	British Television documentary series
