= Fargo Village =

Coordinates: 52.407795°N 1.493806°W

FarGo Village is a creative quarter on Far Gosford Street, Coventry, England. Costing £5 million and opened on 27 September 2014, it is a mixture of mobile catering units, small boutique style units housed in repurposed shipping containers, and larger stores surrounding a marketplace area.

Units include cafes, restaurants, vegan businesses, a craft beer brewery, a bespoke printing and embroidery shop, vintage clothing shops, and a comic book shop run by artist and writer Al Davidson. It also has the world's only museum dedicated to TV actor Phil Silvers. It also features The Box - a 500 person capacity music and drama venue. In 2021, it opened The Factory, a collection of street food businesses connected to indoor and outdoor dining areas.

As well as housing retail units The Village holds regular events such as classic car shows, open air cinema evenings, food festivals and dog shows. It is expected that a stop on the Coventry Very Light Rail tram system will be located there, linking it with the city railway station, Pool Meadow Bus Station and University Hospital Coventry.
