= 54th Street Revue =

American TV variety series (1949–1950)

- Genre: Variety
- Written by: George Axelrod; Allan Sherman; Max Wilk
- Directed by: Ralph Levy
- Presented by: Jack Sterling; Al Bernie; Billy Vine; Joey Faye
- Music by: Al Selden and Bill Scudder
- No. of seasons: 2
- No. of episodes: 29

Production
- Executive producer: Barry Wood
- Running time: 44-52 minutes

Original release
- Network: CBS
- Release: May 5, 1949 – January 20, 1950

54th Street Revue is an American variety television program that was broadcast on CBS from May 5, 1949, through March 25, 1950. The program was a "showcase for up-and-coming professionals", originating from a theater on 54th Street in New York City.

Hosts for 54th Street Revue included Jack Sterling, Al Bernie, Billy Vine, and Joey Faye. Regular performers on the program included Bambi Lynn, Annabel Lyons, Joe Silver, Pat Bright, Russell Arms, Marilyn Day, Cliff Tatum, Butch Cavell, Bob Fosse, Mort Marshall, Wynn Murray, and Carl Reiner The regular cast changed frequently as entertainers found other jobs "that were more substantial than employment in early television".

Barry Wood was the executive producer, with Ralph Levy as director. Al Selden and Bill Scudder created original music and lyrics for the show. Writers included Alan Sands, Jess Kaplan, George Axelrod, Allan Sherman, and Max Wilk. Harry Sosnick directed the orchestra. The program initially was on Thursdays from 8 to 9 p.m. Eastern Time. In September 1949 it moved to Fridays from 9 to 10 p.m., ET, and in January 1950 it moved to Saturdays from 8 to 9 p.m. ET.

Although the program was scheduled to end in late November 1949, its time on the air was extended "at least through Dec. 23". In late January 1950, its run was extended again on an alternate-weeks schedule as two advertising agencies showed interest in its "rising ratings and its low budget".

A review in the February 1, 1950, issue of the trade publication Variety noted that the program's pace had "become too even and placid for its own good."

== Critical response ==
A review in The New York Times called 54th Street Revue "a pleasant enough undertaking, with several bright spots" but said that it was unlikely to change existing TV ratings. The review said that Sterling's personality fell short of what the show needed. The weakest component, it added were sketches, "which for the most part have been very labored". The review concluded with a suggestion that cutting the program to 30 minutes might make it better.
