= Top Banana (musical) =

1951 Broadway musical by Johnny Mercer

- original cast recording
- Music: Johnny Mercer
- Lyrics: Johnny Mercer
- Book: Hy Kraft
- Productions: 1951 Broadway

Top Banana is a musical with music and lyrics by Johnny Mercer and book by Hy Kraft which premiered on Broadway in 1951. The show was written as a star vehicle for comedian Phil Silvers, who played the host of a television variety show program. Silvers won the Tony Award for Best Performance by a Leading Actor in a Musical in 1952.

== Production ==
The musical opened on Broadway at the Winter Garden Theatre on November 1, 1951, and closed on October 4, 1952, after 350 performances. The original cast co-starred Rose Marie, Lindy Doherty, Jack Albertson, Bob Scheerer and Ted "Sport" Morgan. Produced by Paula Stone and Mike Sloane, the musical was directed by Jack Donohue and choreographed by Ron Fletcher, with vocal arrangements and direction by Hugh Martin, musical direction by Harold Hasting, and orchestrations by Don Walker. Scenic and lighting design were by Jo Mielziner and costume design was by Alvin Colt.

The play was filmed and released in a film version by United Artists in 1954.

== Plot ==
Setting: New York City

Jerry Biffle is the star of the Blendo Soap Program. He has been invited to participate in an autograph-signing party for his new book at an important department store. Jerry meets Sally Peters, one of the department-store models, and makes her part of his TV troupe. As part of his campaign to court Sally, Jerry gets Cliff Lane, the tenor of his TV company, to sing to her over the phone. When Sally and Cliff meet, they fall in love, with Biffle ignorant of the complications.

Biffle engineers a big publicity wedding between Cliff and "a girl", not knowing that the woman is Sally. To further complicate his life, Jerry learns that he is about to lose his sponsor. The publicity elopement between his girl and Cliff almost shatters his entire career and life.

When it seems that his whole world will cave in, Jerry's sponsor comes up with a new format for the Blendo program, and as far as Jerry is concerned, the day is saved.

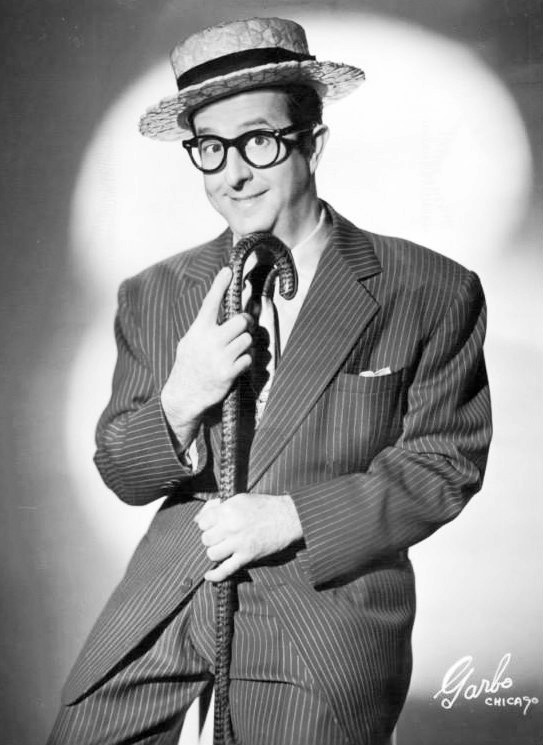
Silvers as Jerry Biffle

== Cast and characters ==
- Phil Silvers as Jerry Biffle
- Rose Marie as Betty Dillon (until 1952)
- Kaye Ballard as Betty Dillion (1952)
- Lindy Doherty as Cliff Lane
- Judy Lynn as Sally Peters
- Jack Albertson as Vic Davis
- Bob Scheerer as Tommy Phelps
- Joey Faye as Pinky
- Grace Lee Whitney as Miss Holland

== Songs ==
Act 1

- "Man of the Year This Week" – Ensemble
- "You're So Beautiful That..." – Cliff Lane
- "Top Banana" – Jerry Biffle, Vic Davis, Cliff Lane, Pinky and Moe
- "Elevator Song" – Ensemble
- "Only If You're in Love" – Cliff Lane and Sally Peters
- "My Home Is in My Shoes" – Tommy and Ensemble
- "I Fought Every Step of the Way" (music by Johnny Mercer and Bill Finnigan) – Betty Dillon
- "O.K. for TV" – Jerry Biffle, Vic Davis, Sally Peters, Pinky, Moe, Danny and Russ Wiswell
- "Slogan Song" – Jerry Biffle, Betty Dillon, Vic Davis, Sally Peters, Cliff Lane, Tommy, Pinky, Moe, Danny, Russ Wiswell and Mr. Parker
- "Meet Miss Blendo" – Entire Company

Act 2

- "Sans Souci" (music by Johnny Mercer and Bill Finnigan) – Betty Dillon, Featured Dancer and Ensemble
- "A Dog Is a Man's Best Friend" – Jerry Biffle, Ted (Sport) Morgan and The Grenadiers
- "That's for Sure" – Cliff Lane, Sally Peters and Ensemble
- "Be My Guest" - – Cliff Lane, Sally Peters and Ensemble (replaced "That's for Sure" during the run)
- "A Word a Day" – Jerry Biffle and Betty Dillon
- "Top Banana Ballet" – Jerry Biffle and Ensemble
- "Finale" – Entire Company

== Reception ==
In his review for The New York Times, Brooks Atkinson wrote: "Phil Silvers will have to look after his health this winter. He is king-pin in a very funny musical show that ought to last as long as he can."

The Life magazine reviewer wrote that "On Broadway today 'Top Banana' is the name of a new rough-and-tumble musical show, which has catapulted Phil Silvers into the small, exalted company of great stage zanies."

Ethan Mordden wrote that Silvers "took four of the funniest minutes in musical comedy history trying to teach a bewildered ingenue how to pull off a commercial, cajoling, hectoring, professorial, puerile, in audition, in tirade."

== Background ==
Silvers had suggested that a musical be made of the "madness of week-to-week television...I would do Uncle Miltie". Milton Berle began hosting the Texaco Star Theater on television in 1948. Because of their friendship, Silvers was able to use his knowledge of Berle to create the character of Jerry Biffle. Later, Berle performed the song "Top Banana" on The Muppet Show with Fozzie Bear.

== Awards and honors ==
Phil Silvers won the 1952 Tony Award for the Best Actor in a Musical.
