= Gosford Street =

Street in Coventry, England

Coordinates: 52.407108°N 1.498638°W

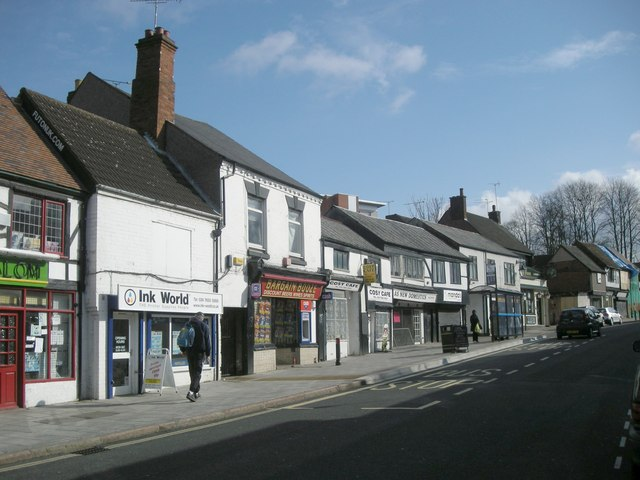
Far Gosford Street, now a conservation area with a mixture of listed buildings from the 16th to 20th century

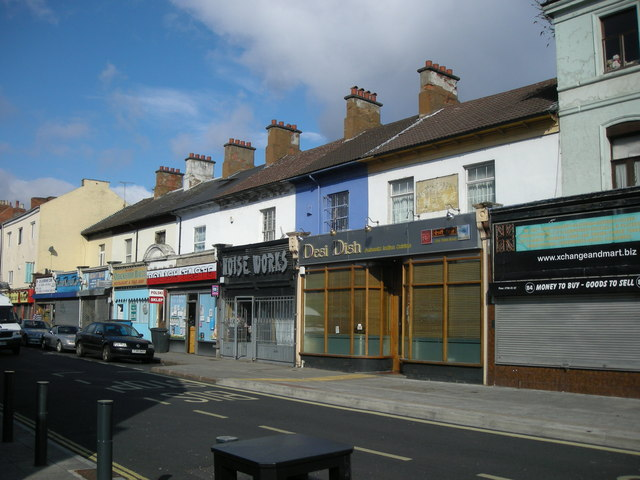
Shops and restaurants near the junction with Binley Road. The shops are single storey add-ons in front of what were originally houses.

Gosford Street (part of which is known as Far Gosford Street) is one of Coventry's most historic streets, located on the edge of the city centre, just beyond the inner ring road. Far Gosford Street is one of the few streets in Coventry that survived modernization, dilapidation and the Blitz. It has 'Gosford Gate' roundabout to its west, Sky Blue Way relief road to its north, Gosford Green to its east and residential terraced street to its south, since the early 20th century.

== History ==
=== Origins ===
Gosford Street was the main route out of Coventry towards Leicester and London in the medieval period. The origin of 'Gosford' was the 'Goose Ford' - an original track that crossed the River Sherbourne.

There were houses fronting the street as early as the 12th century. It became Far Gosford Street denoting that it was an 'extramural' suburb outside a town wall and its gates. In the medieval period, the street was dominated by varieties of trades and crafts, most notable being the woolen industry. The street during the thirteenth century was crammed with metalworkers and locksmiths.

But by the 14th and 15th century, the street was dominated by weavers and drapers, industry including weaving, wool combing and dyeing, and fulling. There were shear-men and tailors next to the Gosford Gate. This street has witnessed several historic events such as the duel between Henry Bolingbroke (later Henry IV) and Thomas Mowbray, Duke of Norfolk, and the execution of the brother and father of Edward IV's queen, Elizabeth.

Silk and ribbon weaving became the predominant trade in the street as of the late 18th and early 19th century, after the arrival of the Huguenots from France escaping from religious persecution. The 'top-shops' associated with this trade appeared in various sectors of the street such as Nos. 67- 72.

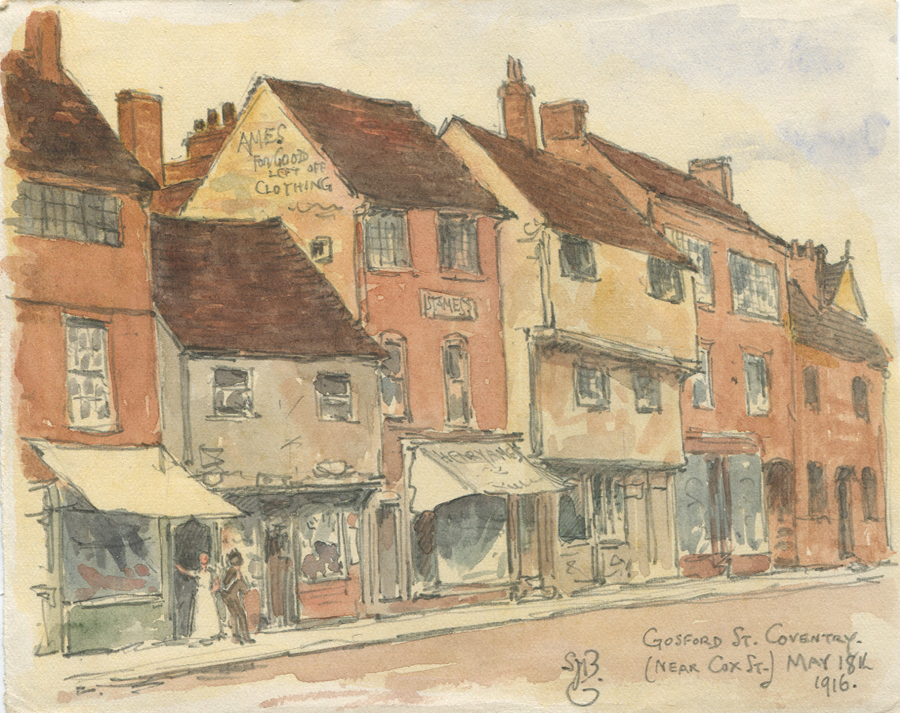
Gosford St. Coventry (near Cox Street) painted by Sydney John Bunney on 18 May 1916

The weaving industries declined after 1860, giving rise to cycle manufacture, and to the car industry. One of the notable relics of this is the Humber Motor Building at the junction of Sky Blue Way, which exists at present as Lloyd TSB Bank.

=== Development ===
Far Gosford Street thrived after the November 1940 Blitz when most of the city centre was destroyed. The street acted as a shopping area during the gradual rebuilding of the city centre. The opening of the Sky Blue Way in 1986 marked the decline of Far Gosford Street. The diverted through traffic and passing trade caused businesses to move and buildings to deteriorate.

The declaration of the Far Gosford Street Conservation Area in 1992 resulted in prioritizing planning proposals that focus on the preservation and enhancement of character and appearance of the conservation area. The economic and physical regeneration of the street began in 2005 when the Townscape Heritage, funded by the Heritage Lottery Fund and Coventry City Council, was established. The regeneration programme expanded and attracted European Regional Development Fund and the private sector Complex Development Projects Ltd. The street started thriving again by 2012, with the completion of some important building and restoration projects and the occupation of the buildings by new businesses.

== Historic buildings ==
Far Gosford Street has fourteen listed buildings, a number of locally listed buildings and other historic buildings as significant elements of the Far Gosford Street Conservation Area.

Most buildings are double-bay buildings of "Wealden" type. A "Wealden" type building is a medieval double bay single house with one bay forming "hall", opening into the roof, and other being two story with a projecting upper floor or "jetty".

=== Numbers 32 and 33 Far Gosford Street ===
The double-bay sixteenth century building is a typical representation of ancient timber-framed building surviving for over a century. The oak lath, mud, dung, and hair plaster infill panels were replaced by bricks, and the parts of timber frame got removed over time. The visible timber frame above the shop front is indicates that it is the building of the "Wealden" type. The projecting first floor is a "jetty". One of the bays of the building may be the main resident room or "hall", with a fireplace and ventilation connecting to the roof.

=== Numbers 38, 39 and 40 Far Gosford Street ===
Number 38 was a double-bay single house with Number 37, which was demolished many years ago. Number 39 and 40 were another double-bay single house, built together and integral to number 41, another double-bay single house. But Number 41 was fronted in bricks later.

=== Numbers 122, 123 and 124 Far Gosford Street ===
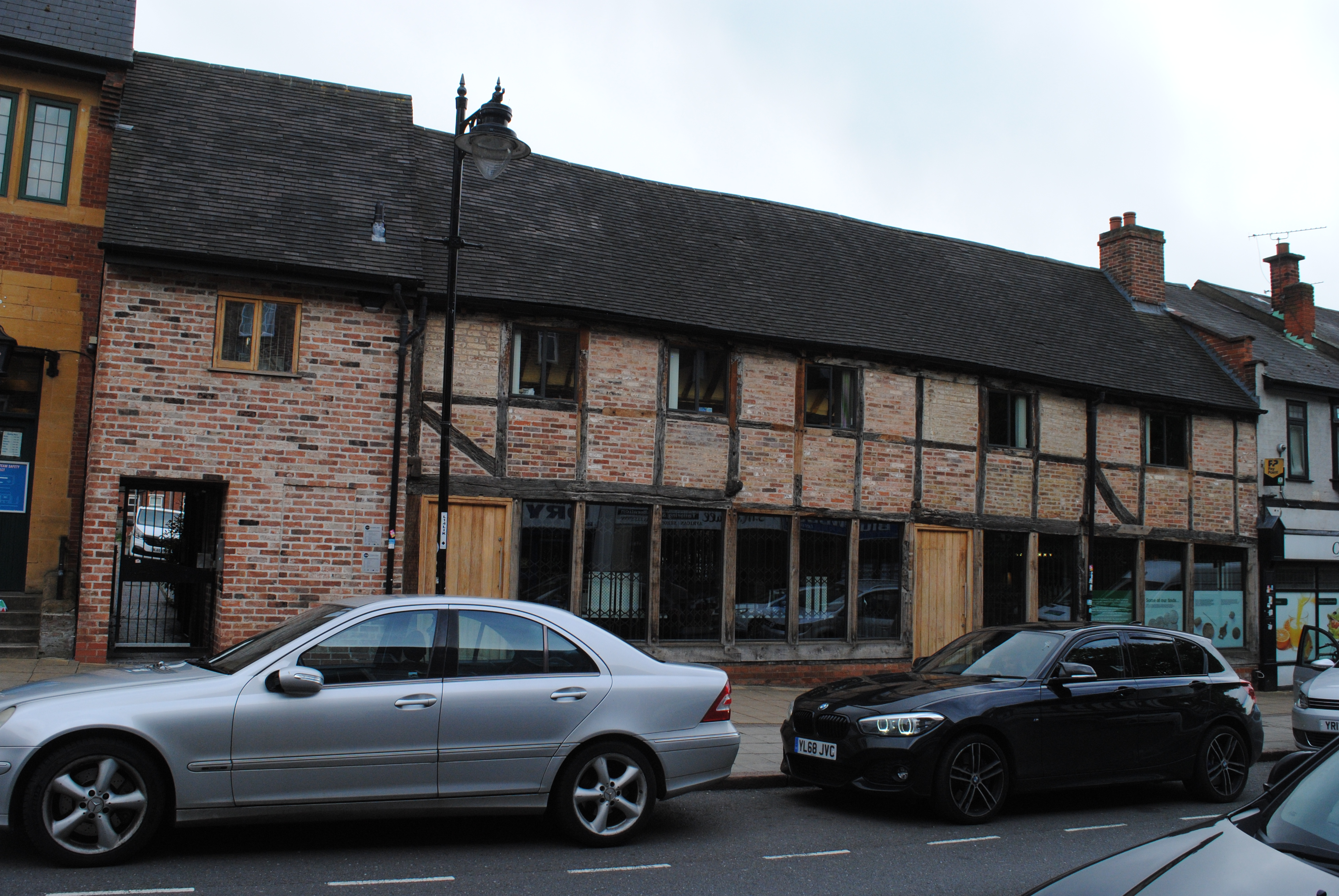
122, 123 and 124, Far Gosford Street

The building is likely to date from the 17th century, and may have begun as a barn. The timbers used to construct the timber-framing were re-used from other buildings. The building was owned by St. Michael's Church, along with 20th-century shops of numbers 126 to 130.

=== Numbers 67-72 Far Gosford Street ===
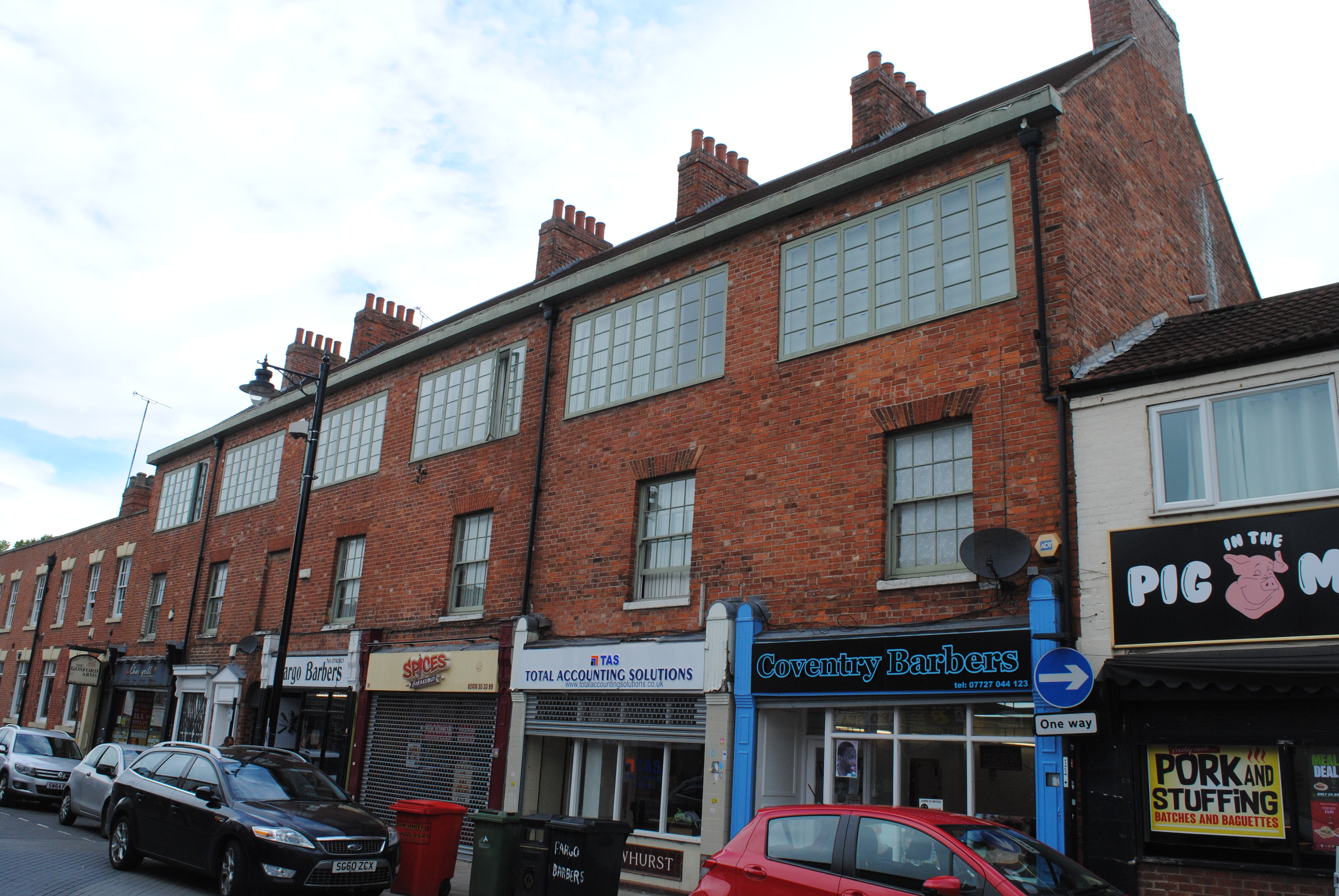
67-72 Far Gosford Street

These buildings are rare survivors of a common building type in medieval Coventry - ribbon weavers "top shops".

The three-storey houses contained a weaving loom at the top with large windows and a rear to provide light, while the floors below were residential areas for the weaver's family.

The "top shops" were built by John Ball around 1830s.

=== Locally listed buildings ===
==== Numbers 64,65 and 66 Far Gosford Street ====
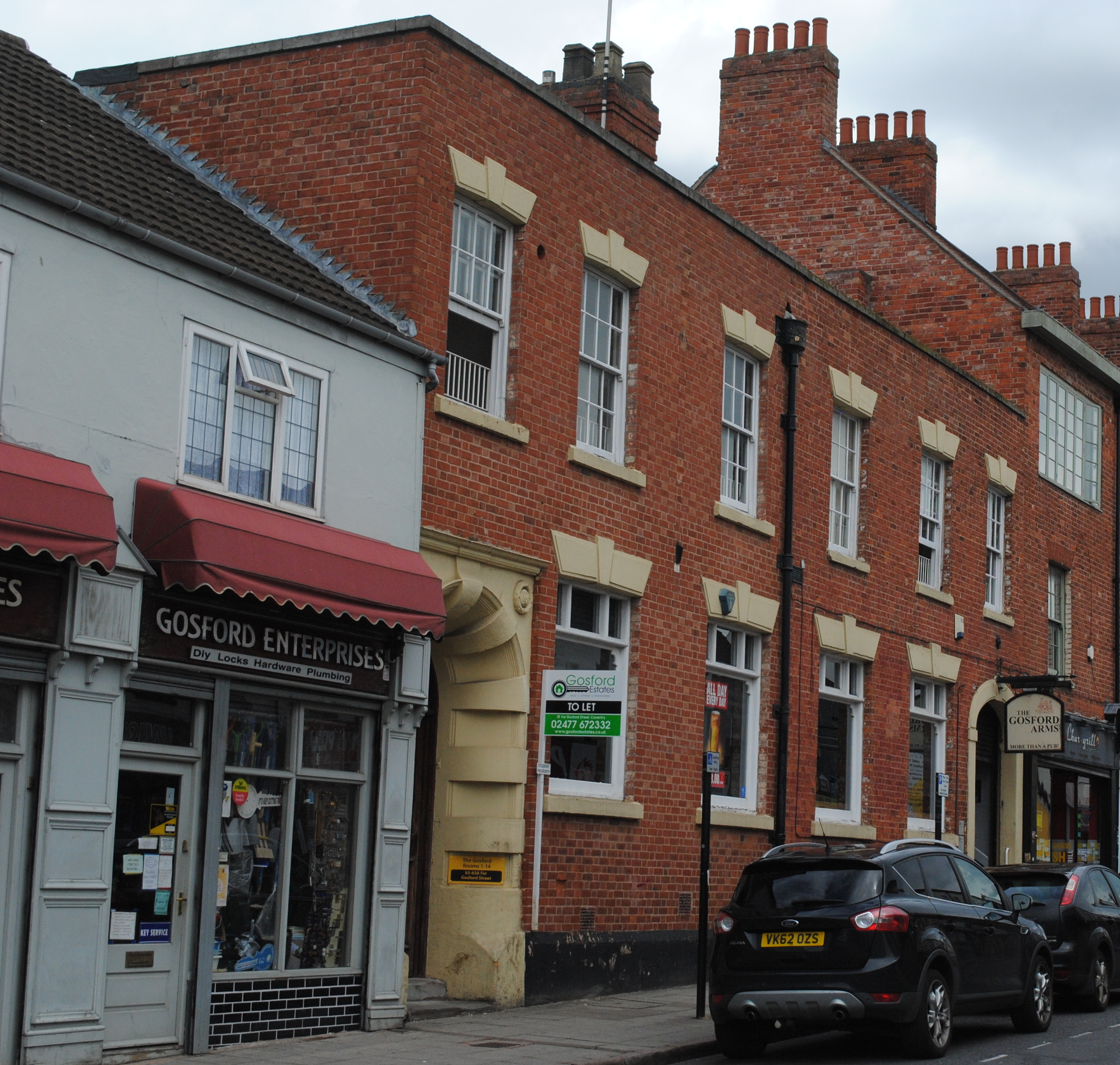
64 nearest camera, 65 & 66, Far Gosford Street, with part of no 67 to the right.

These buildings were known as the Pitt's Head Public House, and now renamed Gosford Arms. Number 65 was an independent commercial premises till 1920, after which it absorbed Number 66.

==== Numbers 73-83 Far Gosford Street ====
Ashville Terrace

==== Numbers 93,94,116 Far Gosford Street ====
Hertford Arms

==== Numbers 154-164 Far Gosford Street ====
These buildings were Calcott Bros.' Offices, but at present they are Callice Court Coventry University student halls of residence.

=== Important buildings ===
==== Hand and Heart ====
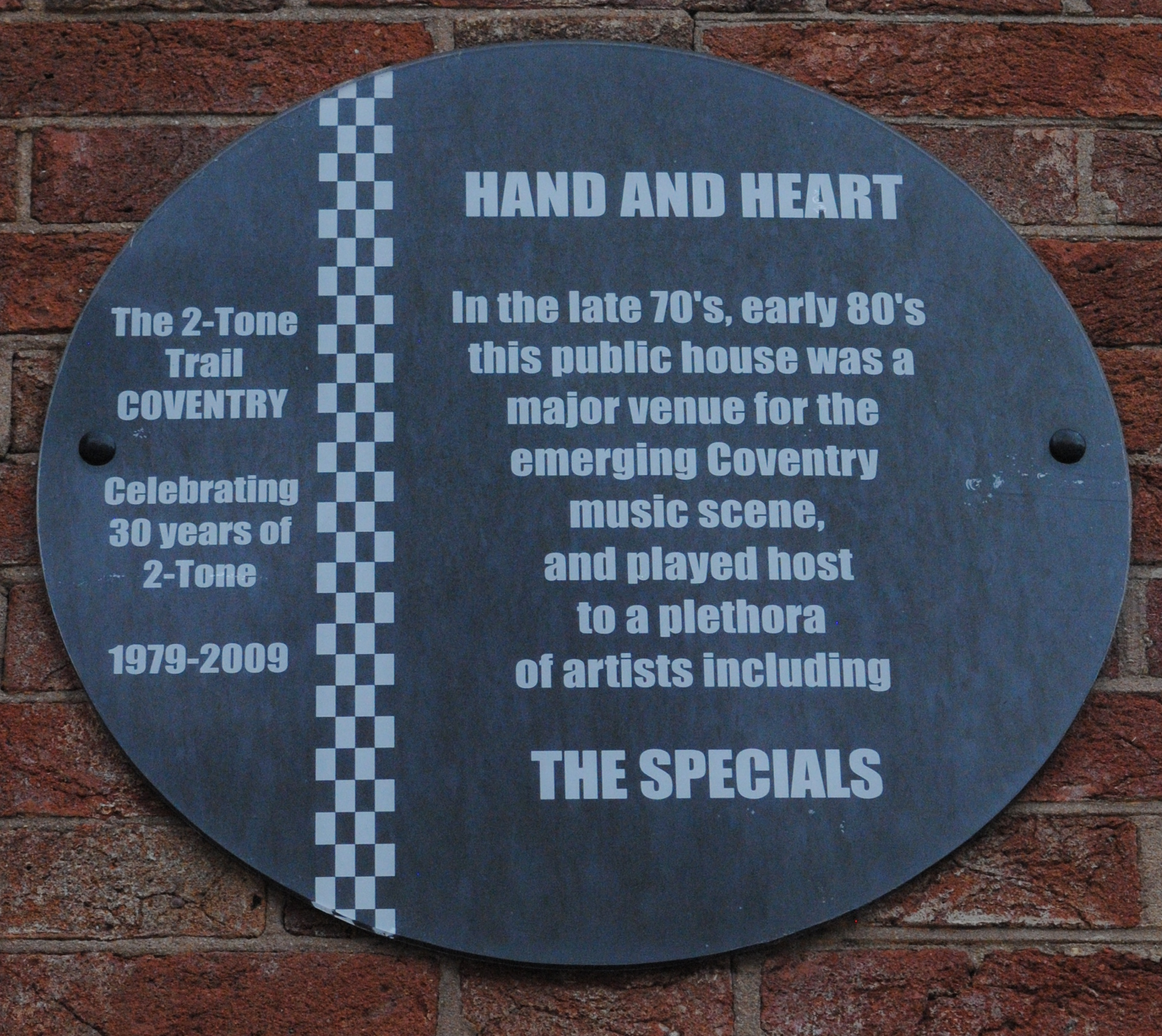
Plaque on the Hand and Heart

The public house existed since 1851, but the current form of the building is an Arts and Crafts style pub built during inter-war years. The building was a popular venue for local bands during 1970s and 80s such as The Specials and The Selecter.

==== The Empire ====
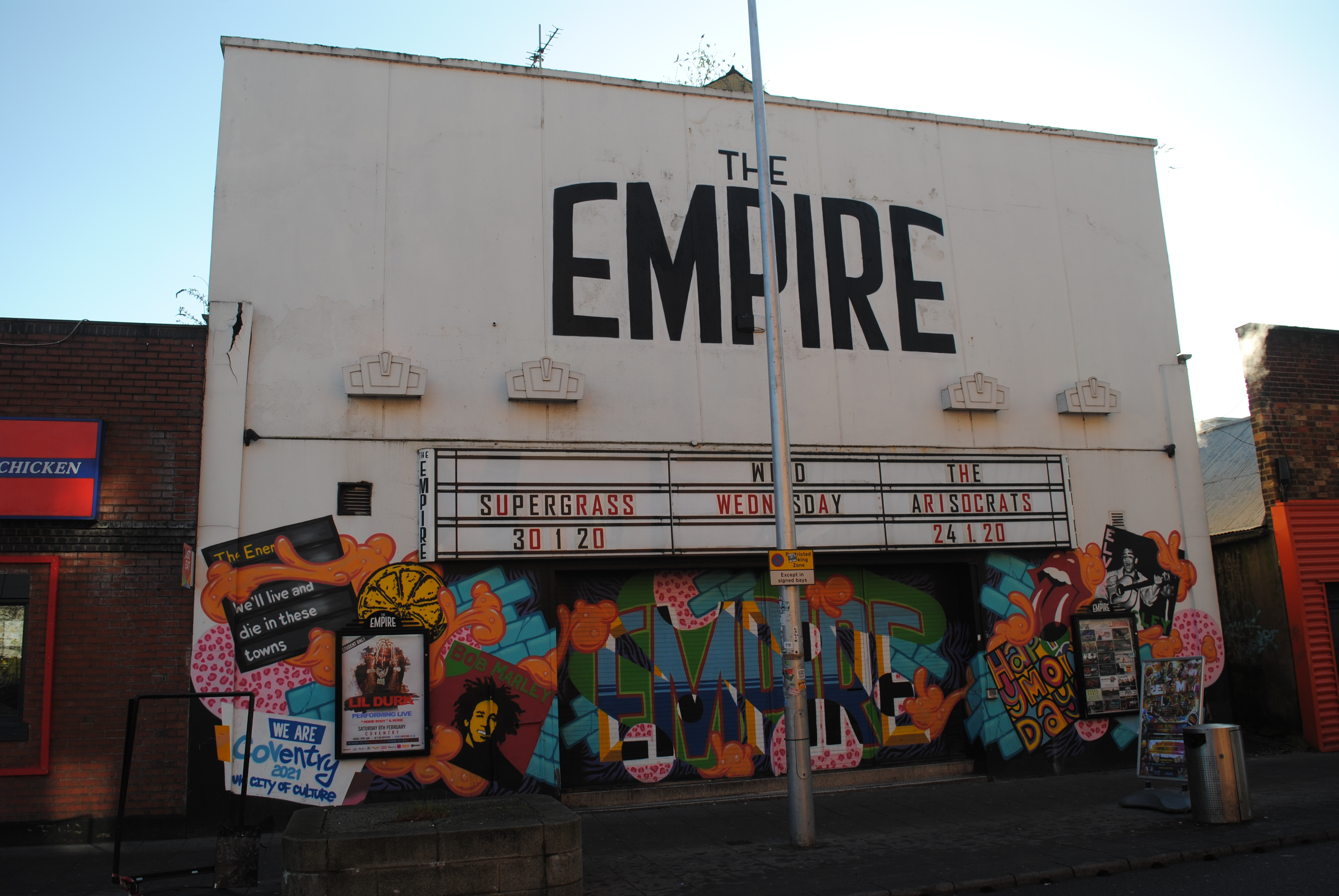
The Empire

The Empire is a former cinema that was used as a music venue. After the expiry of its lease on the building in Far Gosford Street, the venue relocated to a larger and more central site in Hertford Street, opening as HMV Empire in July 2021.

== Far Gosford Street today ==
Far Gosford Street has benefitted from funding support from Townscape Heritage Initiative and completed projects such as restoration of important buildings, adding sensitive new buildings on empty sites, and improving shop fronts on the street.

=== New buildings and restored buildings ===
==== Number 38-40 Far Gosford Street ====
The building partially collapsed during the 15th century and was a focus point for drug users. Now, it is fully restored as part of Phase I Townscape Heritage Initiative.

==== Number 41 Far Gosford Street ====
Number 41 was originally connected to Number 40, but was later faced with brickwork to modernize it. The building partly collapsed after a fire but was later restored by support from Townscape Heritage Initiative and European Regional Development Fund while retaining the medieval timberwork with later Georgian elevation.

==== Number 58 Far Gosford Street ====
Number 58 is a two-storey building with odd monopitch roof facing towards the street. It was built on the land that originally had a row of 14 Court dwellings known as Victoria Place and later Court Number 9. The large stone blocks were discovered in its boundary with Number 59.

==== Number 61-62 Far Gosford Street ====
The buildings were badly damaged by fire and had to be demolished in 2003. The replacement of the buildings was supported by a grant from Phase I Townscape Heritage Initiative. The new buildings are constructed in traditional "topshop" style with large upper-floor windows. The formerly empty upper floors have been converted to student accommodation.

==== Number 65-66 Far Gosford Street ====
The building was hit by incendiary bombs during the Blitz. The unusual flat roof is an indicator of this event. The building was restored as part of the Phase I Townscape Heritage Initiative.

==== Number 67-72 Far Gosford Street ====
The ground floor of Number 68 has been restored by removing render and an aluminium window from the 1980s. The other five buildings were turned into shops in the early 1900s and the tiled features from that year have been retained during the restoration.

==== Number 121-124 Far Gosford Street ====
The building is fully restored with the support from Advantage West Midlands. The restoration and reconstruction of the original timber frames required specific traditional skills. The building now hosts the Regeneration Office.

==== Fargo Village ====
See Fargo Village.
