= Phil Silvers Archival Museum =

Museum in Coventry, England

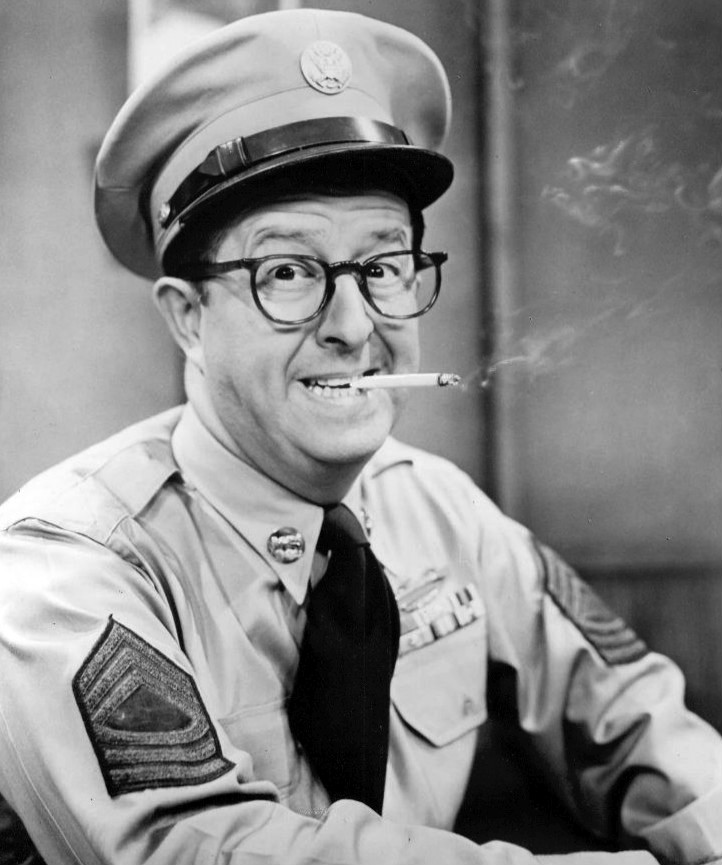
- Phil Silvers as Sergeant Bilko

- Location in West Midlands
- Established: 1 November 2015; 10 years ago
- Coordinates: 52°24′26.8″N 1°29′39.6″W
- Website: www.fargovillage.co.uk/tenants/sgt-bilko

The Phil Silvers Archival Museum in Coventry, England, opened in 2015 and is the only Phil Silvers museum in the world. The museum houses artefacts from Silvers's life including some of his correspondence and clothing.

== Phil Silvers Appreciation Society ==
The museum is dedicated to the American actor Phil Silvers, who was famous for playing Sergeant Bilko on his 1955 to 1959 The Phil Silvers Show. The museum was founded by Steve Everitt, a Coventry resident. Everitt first saw Silvers in a rerun of his show in 1981 when Everitt was a teenager, watching television after his parents had gone to bed. Everitt afterwards sent Silvers birthday and Christmas cards and letters. Everitt, with Mick Clews, founded the Phil Silvers Appreciation Society in 1984. Silvers was supportive of the organisation and contributed a telephone interview to a 1985 episode of the BBC's Pebble Mill at One, on which Everitt was being interviewed. This interview was the last broadcast interview before Silvers's 1985 death.

== Museum ==
Everitt went on to establish a shop (Sgt Bilko's Vintage Emporium) at Coventry's FarGo Village, selling television memorabilia. Everitt established the Phil Silvers Archival Museum within his shop, partly funded by selling his home. He found support from Silvers's daughter, Tracey, who donated his correspondence from Everitt and other personal items, and from donations from Silvers's fellow cast members. The collection includes a smoking jacket, waistcoat and a pair of glasses worn by Silvers. The estate of actress Debbie Reynolds donated a jacket worn by Silvers during a screen test for the 1944 film Something for the Boys. A 1940s television set has been modified to continually show episodes of the Phil Silvers Show. The museum opened to the public on 1 November 2015, the 30th anniversary of Silvers's death, and was initially free to enter. Despite being Coventry's smallest museum, it has been described in The Boar (the University of Warwick student newspaper) as "one of Coventry’s major attractions". It is the only Phil Silvers museum in the world and is open seven days a week.

Whilst maintaining the museum Everitt has also helped with the quality control of a DVD boxed set of the Phil Silvers Show and hosted a screening of the show at the British Film Institute. He also successfully campaigned for Silvers to receive a star on the Hollywood Walk of Fame. The museum has been visited by comedians and actors including Phill Jupitus, Danny Baker, Paul Merton, Nick Hancock, Tim Vine and Paul Bradley. Baker donated a signed programme from Silvers's Broadway show High Button Shoes. The museum has also received support from Mark Hamill.

Everitt now co-owns the museum with Clews. They plan to move the museum to larger premises in the future. It was expanded after a successful crowdfunding campaign and expanded again in March–April 2021. It now charges an admission fee of £3.
