= H. S. Kraft =

American dramatist

Hy Kraft
- Playwright, screenwriter
- Born: April 30, 1899; New York City, New York, U.S.
- Died: July 29, 1975 (aged 76); New York City, New York, U.S.
- Occupations: Playwright, screenwriter Theatrical producer
- Writing career
- Genres: Comedy, musical theatre

Hyman Solomon Kraft (April 30, 1899 – July 29, 1975), aka Hy Kraft, H.S. Kraft, or Harold Kent (pseudonym due to Hollywood Blacklist), was an American screenwriter, playwright, and theatrical producer.

Among the notable comedy plays that he wrote were Ten Per Cent (1932), Poppa (1929), Cafe Crown (1942), and Top Banana (1952). In 1964 Cafe Crown was revised as a Broadway musical produced by Philip Rose and Swanlee with music by Albert Hague and lyrics by Marty Brill. The musical plot is set in the early 1930s in and around the Cafe Crown at the corner of Second Avenue and 12th Street in New York City. It had one Broadway revival in 1989.

Hy Kraft's 1954 musical play Top Banana was filmed for the screen and released as a movie in 1954, starring Phil Silvers as a television comic trying to regain his ratings on TV. Feeling the show was a personal swipe at him, Milton Berle wrote of it, "The only public attack I got any pleasure from was the one dreamed up by Hy Kraft and Johnny Mercer, and starring Phil Silvers. It was a big Broadway musical called Top Banana, in which Phil played an egomaniac named Jerry Biffle who had a top-rated television show and who directed his rehearsals with a whistle. It was a vicious and funny swipe at me, and I loved it so much, I offered to sue Hy Kraft for the publicity value. Anything to help. After all, I had put some money into the show."

In 1950 Hy Kraft was made part of the Hollywood blacklist by the House Committee on Un-American Activities, after remarks by Artie Shaw. His screenwriting credits include Stormy Weather (1943) with Lena Horne and short story credit for Smartest Girl In Town (1936) and Champagne Waltz (1937), in the latter case collaborating with Billy Wilder. He also contributed writing (uncredited) to Mark of the Vampire (1935) with Lionel Barrymore and Bela Lugosi.

He wrote an autobiography, On My Way to the Theater, Macmillan, 1971. The jacket reads, "A lifetime's stroll from New York's Lower East Side to Broadway, with side trips to Hollywood, London, and Washington, D.C., and singular associations with Victor Herbert, Theodore Dreiser, Sinclair Lewis, and the House Un-American Activities Committee."

In 1968, he signed the "Writers and Editors War Tax Protest" pledge, vowing to refuse tax payments in protest against the Vietnam War.

== Personal life ==
Kraft was born and died in New York City. He was married to Reata Field (born Reatta Lautterstein), a costume designer. The couple's only child, his daughter, Jill Kraft, Mrs. Leonard Herman, was an actress. She died in 1969 of cancer, and was survived by her husband, and daughter, Lucy.

H.S. Kraft died in 1975, aged 76. Reata Kraft (1904–1978) died in New York, aged 73.
