= Phil Silvers =

American actor (1911–1985)

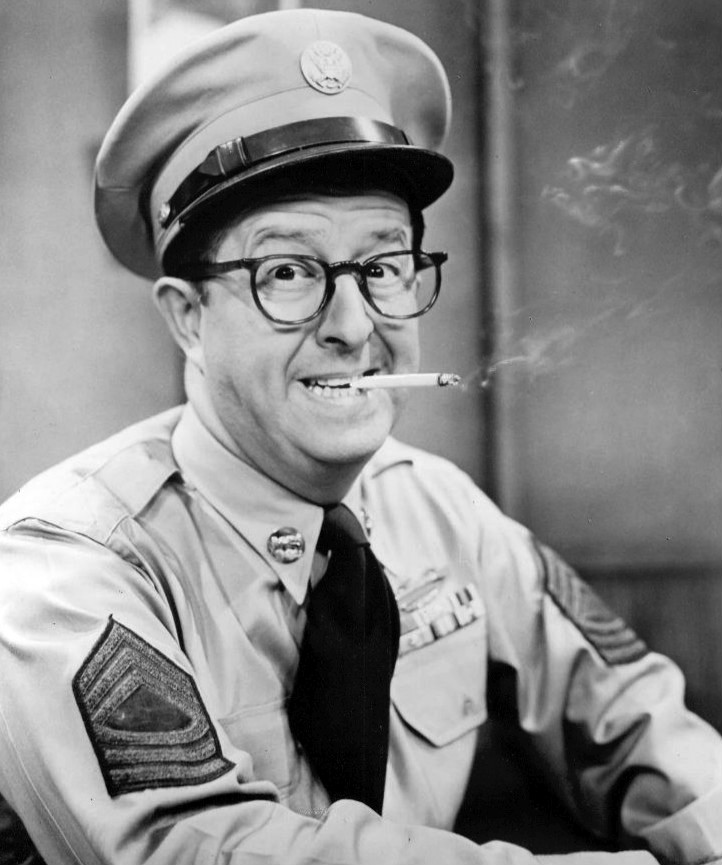
- Silvers as Sgt. Bilko
- Born: Phillip Silver; May 11, 1911; Brooklyn, New York, U.S.
- Died: November 1, 1985 (aged 74); Los Angeles, California, U.S.
- Notable work: The Phil Silvers Show
- Spouses: Jo-Carroll Dennison (m. 1945; div. 1950) Evelyn Patrick (m. 1956; div. 1966)
- Children: 5

Comedy career
- Years active: 1922–1985
- Genre: Character comedy

Phil Silvers (born Phillip Silver; May 11, 1911 – November 1, 1985) was an American entertainer and comedic actor, known as "The King of Chutzpah". His career as a professional entertainer spanned nearly 60 years. He achieved major popularity when he starred in The Phil Silvers Show, a 1950s sitcom set on a U.S. Army post in which he played Master Sergeant Ernest (Ernie) Bilko. He also starred in the films It's a Mad, Mad, Mad, Mad World (1963) and A Funny Thing Happened on the Way to the Forum (1966). He was a winner of two Primetime Emmy Awards for his work on The Phil Silvers Show and two Tony Awards for his performances in Top Banana and A Funny Thing Happened on the Way to the Forum. He also wrote the original lyrics to the jazz standard "Nancy (with the Laughing Face)".

== Early life ==
Born Philip Silver on May 11, 1911, in Brooklyn, New York, Silvers was the eighth and youngest child of Russian Jewish immigrants, Saul and Sarah (née Handler) Silver. His father, a sheet metal worker, helped build the early New York skyscrapers.

== Career ==
Silvers began entertaining at the age of 11, when he would sing in theaters when the film projector broke (a common occurrence in those days), to the point where he was allowed to keep attending the same movie theater free of charge, to sing through any future breakdowns. By age 13, he was working as a singer in the Gus Edwards Revue. Subsequently, he worked in vaudeville and as a burlesque comic.

Like many New York-based actors, Phil Silvers found work at Warner Bros.' Vitaphone studio in Brooklyn. His first job was an incidental role in the Jack Haley short Success (1931). He returned to Vitaphone in 1937 to make additional shorts, such as Ups and Downs (1937) and The Candid Kid (1938). He made his Broadway début in Yokel Boy in 1939. Critics raved about Silvers, who was hailed as the bright spot in the mediocre play. The Broadway revue High Kickers (1941) was based on his concept.

He made his feature-film début in Hit Parade of 1941 in 1940 (his previous appearance as a 'pitch man' in Strike Up the Band was cut). Over the next two decades, he worked as a character actor for Warner Bros., Metro-Goldwyn-Mayer, Columbia, and 20th Century Fox, in such films as All Through the Night (1942) with Humphrey Bogart. Around the same time, he played a scene with W. C. Fields in Tales of Manhattan (also 1942) which was cut from the original release, but restored decades later in home video issues. Silvers also appeared in Lady Be Good (1941), Coney Island (1943), Cover Girl (1944), with Gene Kelly and Rita Hayworth, and in Summer Stock (1950) with Kelly and Judy Garland. When the studio system began to decline, he returned to the stage.

Silvers wrote the lyrics for Frank Sinatra's "Nancy (with the Laughing Face)". Although he was not a songwriter, he wrote the lyrics while visiting composer Jimmy Van Heusen. The two composed the song for Van Heusen's writing partner Johnny Burke, for his wife Bessie's birthday. Substituting Sinatra's little daughter's name Nancy at her birthday party, the trio pressed the singer to record it himself. The song became a popular hit in 1945 and was a staple in Sinatra's live performances. Toward the end of World War II, Silvers entertained the troops during several successful overseas USO tours with Sinatra.

=== The Phil Silvers Show ===
Silvers became a household name in 1955 when he starred as Sergeant Ernest G. Bilko in You'll Never Get Rich, later retitled The Phil Silvers Show. The military comedy became a television hit, with the opportunistic Bilko fast-talking his way through one obstacle after another. In 1958, CBS switched the show to be telecast on Friday nights and moved the setting to Camp Fremont in California. A year later, the show was off the schedule, but it was no fault of the program; Silvers decided to end the series while it was at its height. In the 1963–1964 television season, he appeared as Harry Grafton, a factory foreman interested in get-rich-quick schemes, much like the previous Bilko character, in CBS's 30-episode The New Phil Silvers Show, with co-stars Stafford Repp, Herbie Faye, Buddy Lester, Elena Verdugo as his sister, Audrey, and her children, played by Ronnie Dapo and Sandy Descher.

=== Film roles ===
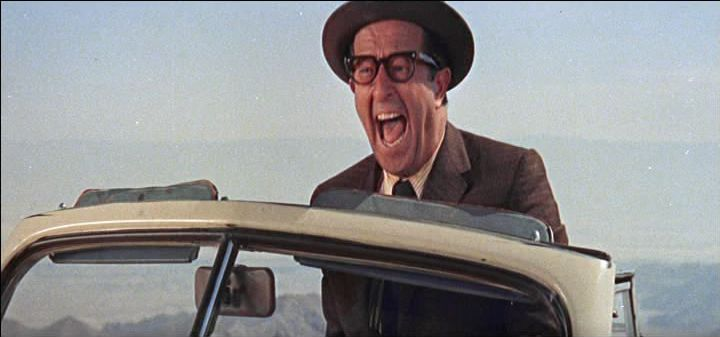
Silvers in It's a Mad, Mad, Mad, Mad World (1963)

Throughout the 1960s, he appeared in films such as It's a Mad, Mad, Mad, Mad World (1963) and 40 Pounds of Trouble (1963). According to the documentary on the DVD of It's a Mad, Mad, Mad, Mad World, Silvers was not a traditional comedian: he was a comic actor. He never did stand-up, and, out of character, was not known for cracking jokes.

He was featured in the unfinished Something's Got to Give (1962) with Marilyn Monroe and Dean Martin. In 1967, he starred as a guest in one of the British Carry On films, Follow That Camel, a Foreign Legion parody in which he played a variation of the Sergeant Bilko character, Sergeant Nocker. Producer Peter Rogers employed him to ensure the Carry On films' success in America, though Silvers's presence did not ensure the film's success on either side of the Atlantic. His salary was £30,000, the largest Carry On salary ever, only later met by the appearance of Elke Sommer in Carry On Behind.

=== Broadway ===
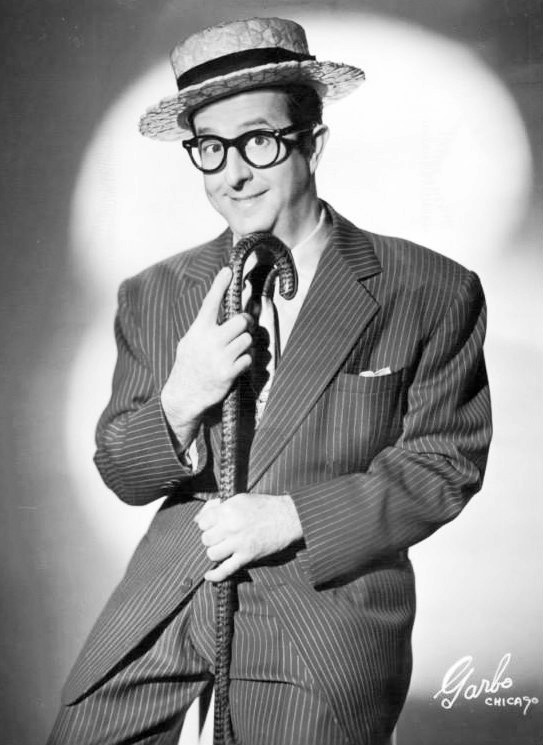
Publicity photo of Silvers from the musical Top Banana

When Silvers played the quintessential con-man Harrison Floy in the 1947 Broadway production of High Button Shoes, Brooks Atkinson praised him as "an uproarious comic. He has the speed, the drollery and the shell-game style of a honky-tonk buffoon." Silvers later scored a major triumph in Top Banana, a Broadway show of 1952. Silvers played Jerry Biffle, the egocentric, always-busy star of a major television show. (The character is said to have been based on Milton Berle.) Silvers dominated the show and won a Tony Award for his performance. He repeated the role in the 1954 film version which was initially released in 3-D. Silvers returned to Broadway in the musical Do Re Mi in December 1960, receiving a nomination for the Tony Award for Best Performance by a Leading Actor in a Musical. Stanley Green wrote, "It was particularly blessed by offering two outstanding clowns in Phil Silvers as the pushiest of patsies and Nancy Walker." Silvers was offered the leading role of conniving Roman slave Pseudolus in the Broadway musical comedy A Funny Thing Happened on the Way to the Forum. Silvers declined, and the role went instead to Zero Mostel, who was so successful in the role that he repeated the role in the 1966 film version. By this time, Silvers realized his error and agreed to appear in the film as a secondary character, flesh merchant Marcus Lycus. When actor-producer Larry Blyden mounted a Broadway revival of Forum in 1972, he wanted Phil Silvers to play the lead, and this time Silvers agreed. The revival was a hit and Silvers became the first leading actor ever to win a Tony Award in a revival of a musical.

=== Later career ===
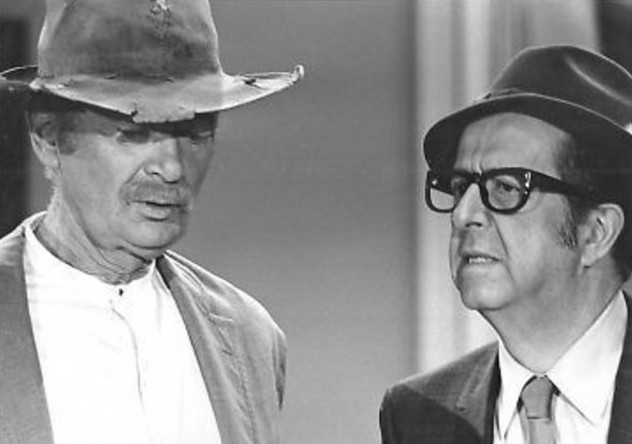
Buddy Ebsen and Silvers (as recurring con-man Shifty Shafer) in The Beverly Hillbillies (circa 1969–1970)

Later in his career, Silvers guest-starred on The Beverly Hillbillies, and various TV variety shows such as The Carol Burnett Show, Rowan & Martin's Laugh-In and The Dean Martin Show. He appeared as curmudgeonly Hollywood producer Harold Hecuba in the classic 1966 episode "The Producer" on Gilligan's Island, where he and the castaways performed a musical version of Hamlet. (Silvers's production company Gladasya – named after his catchphrase "Gladdaseeya!" – financed the show.) He continued to make guest appearances in television sitcoms including, The Love Boat, Fantasy Island, Happy Days, and his final screen credit CHiPs in 1983. He also starred in various television specials and talk shows such as The Bob Hope Special, The Jackie Gleason Show, The Merv Griffin Show, The Dick Cavett Show, The David Frost Show, The Tonight Show with Johnny Carson and The Mike Douglas Show. In 1980, Silvers participated in The Friar's Club Tribute to Milton Berle alongside Don Rickles, Dick Shawn, Walter Matthau, Jack Lemmon, George Burns, Karl Malden, and Robert Culp.

== Personal life ==
Phil Silvers was married twice, to Jo-Carroll Dennison and to Evelyn Patrick. Both of his marriages ended in divorce. He had five daughters, including Cathy, all by his second wife, Evelyn Patrick, who later married British musician Terry Dene.

Like his alter-ego Ernie Bilko, Silvers was a compulsive gambler, and also suffered from chronic depression. He suffered a nervous breakdown in 1962 while performing in Spain. While staying in Reno, Nevada, in the 1950s, he would often gamble all night. On one occasion, at the tiny Cal-Neva Lodge in nearby Lake Tahoe, Nevada, Silvers spent an entire night playing craps until he lost all his money and then went through $1,000 in credit. A taxi was called to return him to Reno. It was one "of the worst nights of my life", Silvers told the driver, adding, "Don't wait for any lights and don't wait for any tip . . . I left it at the Cal-Neva!"

His memoir is titled This Laugh Is On Me.

== Illness and death ==
Silvers suffered a stroke during the run of A Funny Thing Happened on the Way to the Forum in August 1972 at the Lunt-Fontanne Theatre. He was left with slurred speech. Despite his poor health, he continued working, playing Harry Starman in the 1974 "Horror in the Heights" episode of Kolchak: The Night Stalker starring Darren McGavin. His guest appearances continued into the early 1980s, including co-starring in The Chicken Chronicles (1977), an appearance on Fantasy Island as an old comic trying to reunite with his old partner, and on Happy Days as the father of Jenny Piccolo (played by his real-life daughter, Cathy). Silvers played the cab driver Hoppy in Neil Simon's send-up of hard-boiled detective films, The Cheap Detective (1978), which starred Peter Falk. In his cab, Silvers can be heard (three words) and seen turning his head towards the camera and breaking into a smile (1/4 fps) at the film's ending immediately prior to Falk entering "Hoppy's" cab. His final appearance was in an episode of CHiPs (entitled "Hot Date") in 1983.

In a later DVD audio commentary for the British comedy film Carry On Follow That Camel (1967), actor Jim Dale recalled that Silvers would sometimes repeat the same anecdotes several times during filming. According to Dale, this initially irritated some members of the cast, including Kenneth Williams, before they realised Silvers may have been experiencing short-term memory difficulties.

On November 1, 1985, Silvers died in his sleep in Century City, California. He is interred at Mount Sinai Memorial Park Cemetery in Los Angeles.

== Legacy ==
In 1996, TV Guide ranked him number 31 on its 50 Greatest TV Stars of All Time list.

In 2003, The Phil Silvers Show was voted Best Sitcom in the Radio Times Guide to TV Comedy. In a 2005 poll to find The Comedian's Comedian, Silvers was voted #42 on the list of the top 50 comedy acts ever by fellow comedians and comedy insiders. Dick Van Dyke, who made his TV debut on Bilko, says he "was always fascinated with Phil's sense of timing. Incredible."

Voice actor Daws Butler employed an impression of Silvers as the voice of the Hanna-Barbera cartoon character Hokey Wolf and also used the same voice in numerous cartoons for Jay Ward. The premise of The Phil Silvers Show was the basis for the Hanna-Barbera animated series Top Cat, for which Arnold Stang moderately imitated Silvers's voice for the title character.

Sgt Bilko's Vintage Emporium and The Phil Silvers Archival Museum houses personal and commercial memorabilia collected by Silvers's correspondent Steve Everitt. Opened in 2015 it is located in FarGo Village, Coventry, United Kingdom.

== Work ==
=== Radio (abridged) ===
| Title | Date |
|---|---|
| The Rudy Vallee Sealtest Show | June 19, July 17, 1941 |
| Command Performance | June 23, 1942; September 29, 1947 |
| Mail Call | January 09, 1943 |
| The Kraft Music Hall | September 30, December 16, 1943; February 24, 1944 |
| The Dinah Shore Program | October 14, 1943 |
| The Hollywood Democratic Committee broadcast | October 08, 1944 |
| The Phil Silvers Show (NBC radio) | February 09, 1946 |
| The Phil Silvers Show (ABC radio) | June 25 to October 20, 1947 |
| Songs By Sinatra | May 21, 1947 |
| The Big Show | December 1, 1950 |
| Suspense "The Swift Rise Of Eddie Albright" | April 03, 1947 |

=== Theatre ===
| Year | Title | Role | Venue | Ref |
|---|---|---|---|---|
| 1939 | Yokel Boy | "Punko" Parks | Majestic Theatre, Broadway | |
| 1947 | High Button Shoes | Harrison Floy | Broadway Theatre, Broadway | |
| 1951 | Top Banana | Jerry Biffle | Winter Garden Theatre, Broadway | |
| 1960 | Do Re Mi | Hubert Cram | 54th Street Theatre, Broadway; U.S. National Tour | |
| 1971 | How the Other Half Loves | Frank Foster | Royale Theatre, Broadway | |
| 1972 | A Funny Thing Happened on the Way to the Forum | Pseudolus/Prologus | Lunt-Fontanne Theatre, Broadway | |

=== Filmography ===
Source: Turner Classic Movies

| Year | Title | Role | Notes |
|---|---|---|---|
| 1937 | Ups and Downs | Charlie | Short film |
| 1940 | Strike Up the Band | Pitch Man | Scenes deleted |
| 1940 | Hit Parade of 1941 | Charlie Moore | |
| 1941 | The Wild Man of Borneo | Murdock | |
| 1941 | The Penalty | Hobo | |
| 1941 | Tom, Dick and Harry | Ice Cream Vendor | |
| 1941 | Ice-Capades | Larry Herman | |
| 1941 | Lady Be Good | Master of Ceremonies | |
| 1941 | You're in the Army Now | Breezy Jones | |
| 1942 | Roxie Hart | Babe | |
| 1942 | My Gal Sal | Wiley | |
| 1942 | All Through the Night | Waiter | |
| 1942 | Footlight Serenade | Slap | |
| 1942 | Tales of Manhattan | 1st Salesman at Santelli's | Uncredited; scenes deleted |
| 1942 | Just Off Broadway | Roy Higgins | |
| 1943 | Coney Island | Frankie | |
| 1943 | A Lady Takes a Chance | Smiley Lambert | |
| 1944 | Four Jills in a Jeep | Eddie | |
| 1944 | Cover Girl | Genius | |
| 1944 | Take It or Leave It | Phil Silvers | |
| 1944 | Something for the Boys | Harry Hart | |
| 1945 | Diamond Horseshoe | Blinkie Miller | |
| 1945 | Don Juan Quilligan | 'Mac' MacDenny | |
| 1945 | A Thousand and One Nights | Abdullah | |
| 1946 | If I'm Lucky | Wallingham M. 'Wally' Jones | |
| 1950 | Summer Stock | Herb Blake | |
| 1954 | Top Banana | Jerry Biffle | |
| 1954 | Lucky Me | Hap Schneider | |
| 1962 | Something's Got to Give | Insurance Salesman | Incomplete |
| 1962 | 40 Pounds of Trouble | Bernie Friedman | |
| 1963 | It's a Mad, Mad, Mad, Mad World | Otto Meyer | |
| 1966 | A Funny Thing Happened on the Way to the Forum | Marcus Lycus | |
| 1967 | A Guide for the Married Man | Technical Advisor (Realtor) | |
| 1967 | Follow That Camel | Sergeant Nocker | |
| 1968 | Buona Sera, Mrs. Campbell | Phil Newman | |
| 1970 | The Boatniks | Harry Simmons | |
| 1975 | The Strongest Man in the World | Kirwood Krinkle | |
| 1976 | Won Ton Ton, the Dog Who Saved Hollywood | Murray Fromberg | |
| 1977 | The Chicken Chronicles | Max Ober | |
| 1977 | The Night They Took Miss Beautiful | Marv Barker | |
| 1978 | The Cheap Detective | Hoppy | |
| 1979 | Racquet | Arthur Sargent | |
| 1980 | The Happy Hooker Goes Hollywood | William B. Warkoff | |
| 1980 | There Goes the Bride | Psychiatrist | |

=== Television ===
| Year | Title | Role | Notes |
|---|---|---|---|
| 1948 | The Phil Silvers Arrow Show | Host-Performer | 3 episodes |
| 1955–59 | The Phil Silvers Show | MSgt. Ernest G. 'Ernie' Bilko | 143 episodes |
| 1959 | Keep in Step | Himself/Sgt. Ernest G. Bilko | Television movie |
| 1959 | The Ballad of Louie the Louse | Louie | Television movie |
| 1960 | The Slowest Gun in the West | Fletcher Bissell III; The Silver Dollar Kid | Television movie |
| 1962 | The Jack Benny Program | Himself | Episode: "The Phil Silvers Show " |
| 1963 | Judy and Her Guests, Phil Silvers and Robert Goulet | Himself | Television special |
| 1963–64 | The New Phil Silvers Show | Harry Grafton | 30 episodes |
| 1966 | Gilligan's Island | Harold Hecuba | Episode: "The Producer" |
| 1966 | The Lucy Show | Oliver Kasten | Episode: "Lucy and the Efficiency Expert" |
| 1966 | At Your Service | Performer | Unsold pilot |
| 1967 | Damn Yankees | Mr. Applegate | Television movie |
| 1967–70 | The Beverly Hillbillies | Shifty Shafer aka Honest John | 6 episodes |
| 1970 | Rowan & Martin's Laugh-In | Guest Performer | Episode: #4.13 |
| 1971 | Eddie | Eddie Skinner | unsold pilot |
| 1971 | Julia | Capt. Biestoff | Episode: "Swing Low, Sweet Charity" |
| 1972 | The Dean Martin Show | Performer | Episode: #7.24 |
| 1974 | Kolchak: The Night Stalker | Harry | Episode: "Horror in the Heights" |
| 1975 | Get Christy Love! | Uncle Harry | Episode: "A Few Excess Love" |
| 1975 | S.W.A.T. | Russ Baker | 2 episodes |
| 1975 | The Carol Burnett Show | Self | Episode: #8.23 |
| 1976 | Bob Hope Special: Bob Hope in "Joys" | Self | Television special |
| 1977 | The Night They Took Miss Beautiful | Marv Barker | Television movie |
| 1977 | Charlie's Angels | Max Brown | Episode: "Angels on Ice" |
| 1977 | The Love Boat | Stubby/Morris Beckman | 2 episodes |
| 1978 | Fantasy Island | Charlie Parks | Episode: "Carnival/The Vaudevillians" |
| 1979 | Goldie and the Boxer | Wally | Television movie |
| 1980 | Take Me Up to the Ball Game | Irwin | Voice; television movie |
| 1981 | Happy Days | Roscoe Piccalo | Episode: "Just a Piccalo" |
| 1983 | CHiPs | Herman Hinton | Episode: "Hot Date" |

== Awards and nominations ==
| Year | Award | Category | Nominated work | Result | Ref. |
|---|---|---|---|---|---|
| 2014 | Online Film & Television Association Awards | Television Hall of Fame | | Inducted | |
| 1956 | Primetime Emmy Awards | Best Comedian | | Won | |
| 1956 | Primetime Emmy Awards | Best Actor in a Continuing Performance | The Phil Silvers Show | Won | |
| 1957 | Primetime Emmy Awards | Best Continuing Actor in a Comedy Series | The Phil Silvers Show | Nominated | |
| 1958 | Primetime Emmy Awards | Best Continuing Performance by an Actor in a Leading Role in a Dramatic or Comedy Series | The Phil Silvers Show | Nominated | |
| 1959 | Primetime Emmy Awards | Best Actor in a Leading Role (Continuing Character) in a Comedy Series | The Phil Silvers Show | Nominated | |
| 1952 | Tony Awards | Best Actor in a Musical | Top Banana | Won | |
| 1961 | Tony Awards | Best Leading Actor in a Musical | Do Re Mi | Nominated | |
| 1972 | Tony Awards | Best Leading Actor in a Musical | A Funny Thing Happened on the Way to the Forum | Won | |

- In 2000, Silvers received a star on the Hollywood Walk of Fame.

== Notes ==
1. Or "Glad to see you". A 1944 musical titled Glad To See You was written with Silvers intended for the starring role, but he was contracted for the film Diamond Horseshoe and not available (and the musical closed during out-of-town tryouts and did not reach Broadway).
