= Counter-arch =

Historically, the term counter-arch was used in architecture to describe multiple types of arches that provide opposing action:

A diagram of the Moseley bridge design. Counter-arches are designated by t's

- an inverted arch used opposite of a regular one. For example, an inverted arch in an open spandrel or in "Moseley bridges", a popular American Civil War-era design by Thomas William Moseley, where the counter-arches were intended as a low-cost alternative to diagonal bracing;
- any relieving arch;
- outer "rings" of compound arches overlaying the one forming the intrados, used in old English bridges since medieval times, are called "counter-arches" following the works of John Smeaton;
- an arch that is built adjacent to another arch to oppose its forces or help stabilize it. The counter-arch can be used, for example, when constructing the flying buttress,
- buttressing arches built between the opposing building facades over narrow streets of old cities;
- in fortification, an arch built on the tops of counterforts behind the bastion walls intended to limit the scope of the potential wall breaching;
- when a pier of the Old Westminster Bridge started sinking during the construction, Charles Labelye was forced to retrofit the bridge with open spandrels using the counter-arches springing off haunches of the two adjacent arches of the bridge thus relieving the pier.
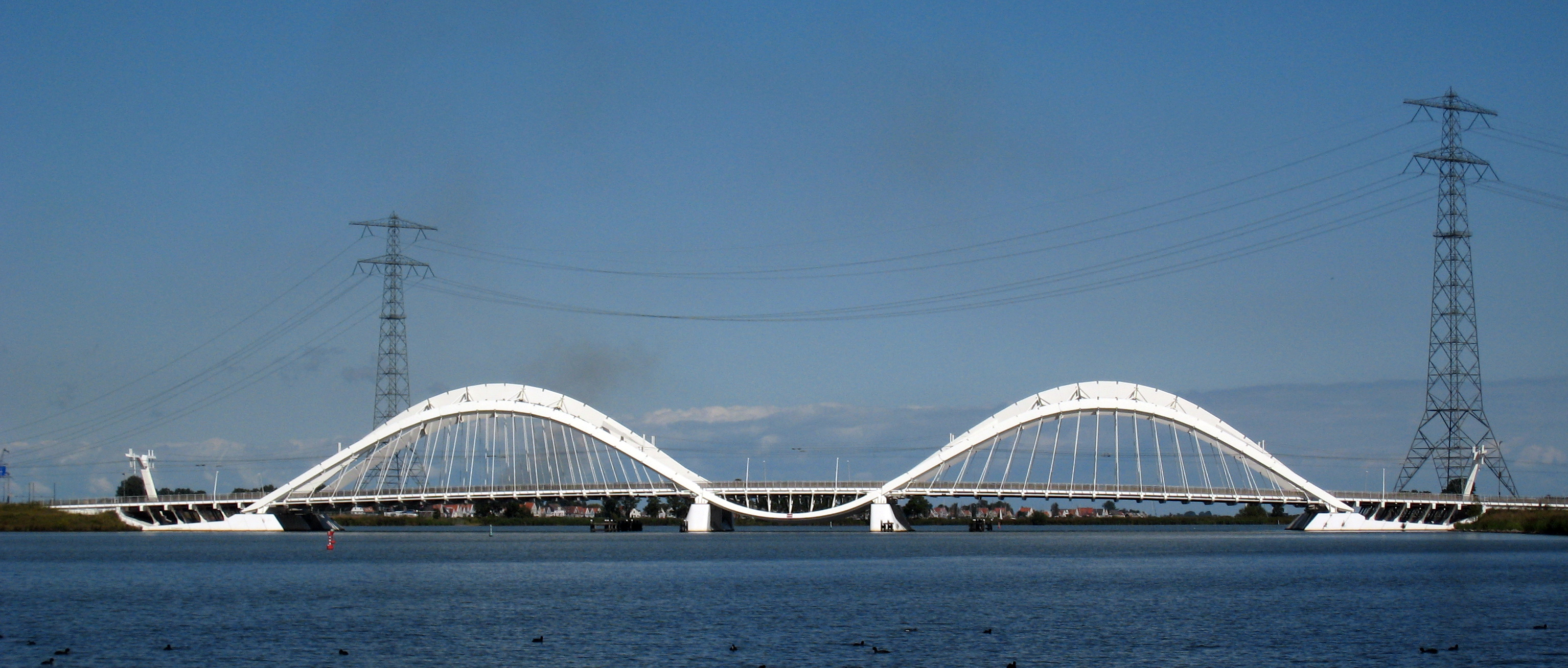
The Enneüs Heerma Bridge showing the inverted counter arch in the middle

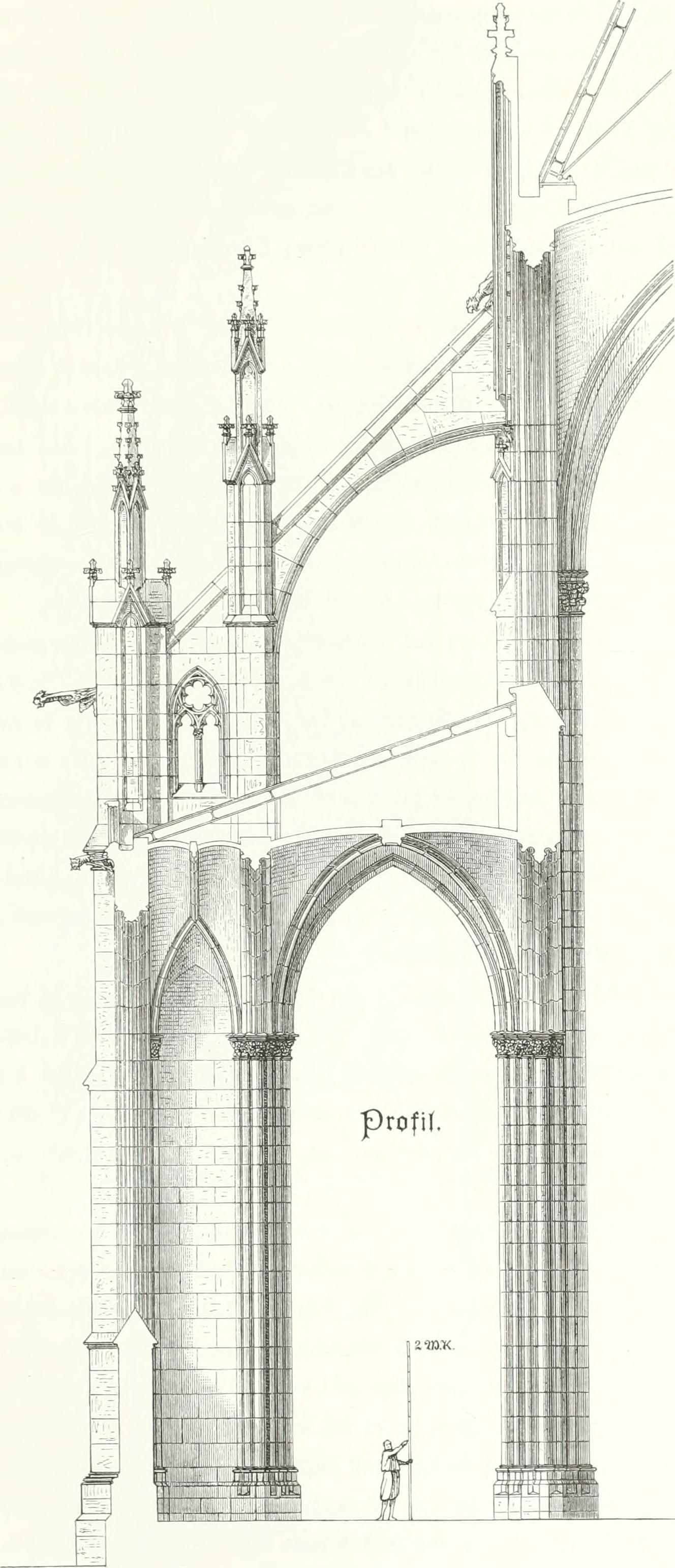
Drawing of a Neo-Gothic flying buttress for the late 19th-century Votive Church, Vienna

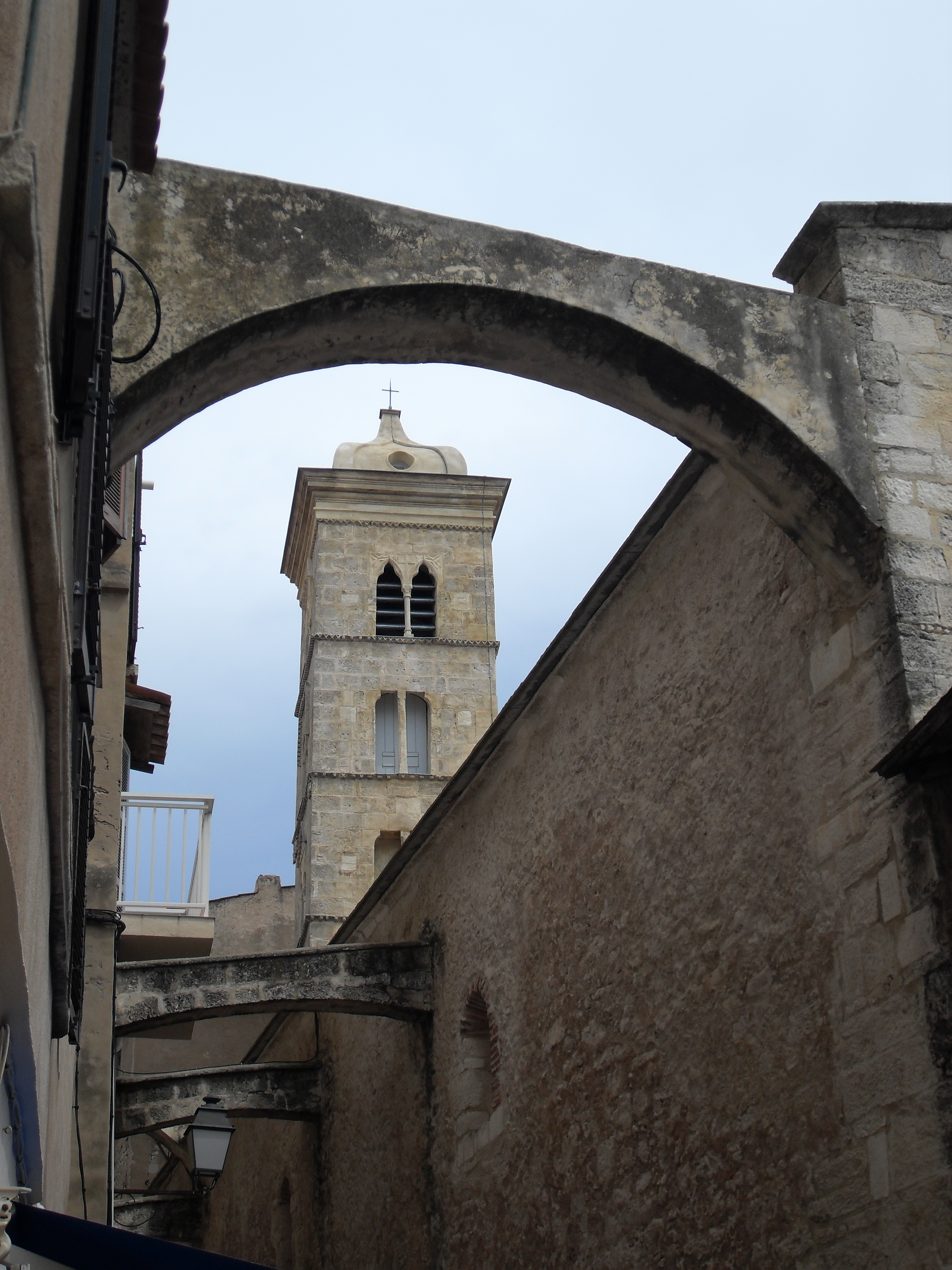
Buttressing counter-arches in Bonifacio, Corsica

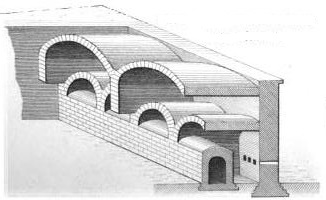
Counter-arched wall of a bastion (the voids are usually filled)

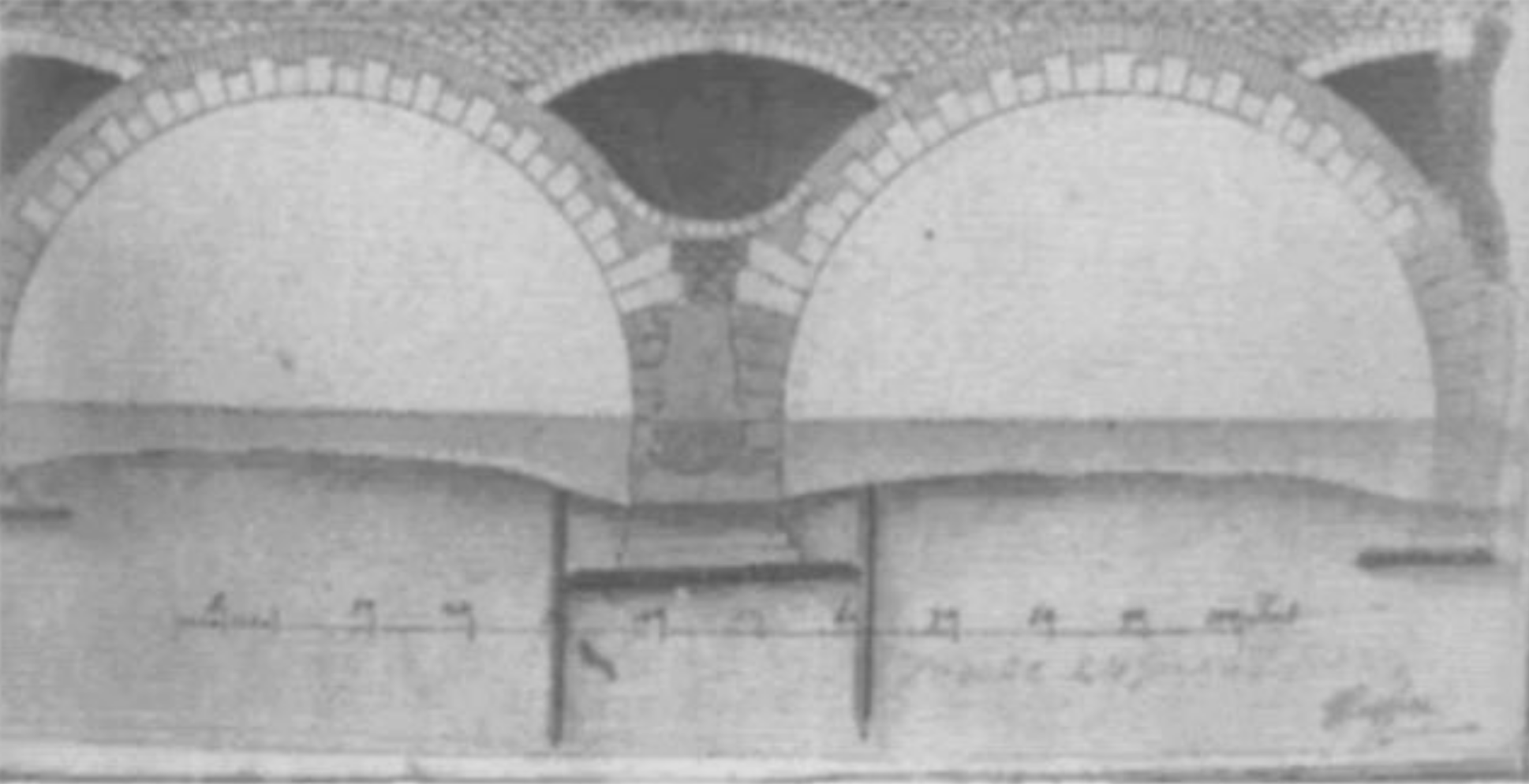
Old Westminster Bridge, with open spandrel

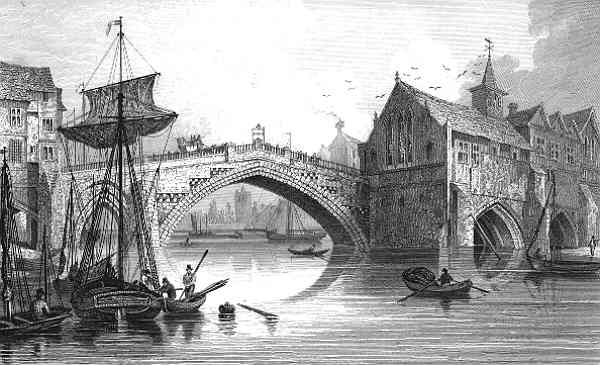
An old Ouse Bridge, York with middle arch using three rings (two "counter-arches")

== See also ==
- Arcade (architecture)
- Flying arch
- Strainer arch

== Sources ==
- Curl, James Stevens (2006). "counter-arch". A Dictionary of Architecture. A Dictionary of Architecture and Landscape Architecture (2nd ed.). Oxford University Press. ISBN 978-0-19-860678-9.
- Murray, J.A.H. (1893). "Counter-arch". A New English Dictionary on Historical Principles: part 1. C-Comm (1893). Clarendon Press.
- Trautwine, J.C. (1874). "The Moseley Bridge". The Civil Engineer's Pocket-book: Of Mensuration, Trigonometry, Surveying, Hydraulics ... Etc. ... Claxton, Remsen & Haffelfinger.
- Hodgson, John A. (1996). The Behaviour of Skewed Masonry Arch Bridges (PDF) (PhD thesis). University of Salford.
- Ruddock, T. (1979). Arch Bridges and Their Builders 1735-1835. Cambridge University Press. ISBN 978-0-521-21816-0.
- Niglio, Olimpia; Ulivieri, Denise (2018). "Vernacular architecture and "historical seismography": an experience research" (PDF). Structural Analysis of Historical Constructions - 2 Volume Set: Possibilities of Numerical and Experimental Techniques - Proceedings of the IVth Int. Seminar on Structural Analysis of Historical Constructions, 10-13 November 2004, Padova, Italy. CRC Press. ISBN 978-0-429-62100-0.
- Lima, A; Correia, M; Gomes, F; Carlos, G; Viana, D; Lourenço, P; Varum, H (2015-09-08). "Systematisation of seismic retrofitting in vernacular architecture". Seismic Retrofitting: Learning from Vernacular Architecture. CRC Press. pp. 235–239. doi:10.1201/b18856-49 (inactive 11 July 2025). ISBN 978-1-138-02892-0.
- Royal Military College, Sandhurst (1852). Outlines of a Course of Lectures on Fortification, Military Tactics, and Perspective: With the Attack and Defence of Fortresses. Spottiswoodes and Shaw.
- Ruddock, E.C. (2017). "Hollow Spandrels in Arch Bridges". Masonry Bridges, Viaducts and Aqueducts. Studies in the History of Civil Engineering. Taylor & Francis. ISBN 978-1-351-91928-9.
