= River Sowe =

River in Warwickshire and the West Midlands, England

Sowe
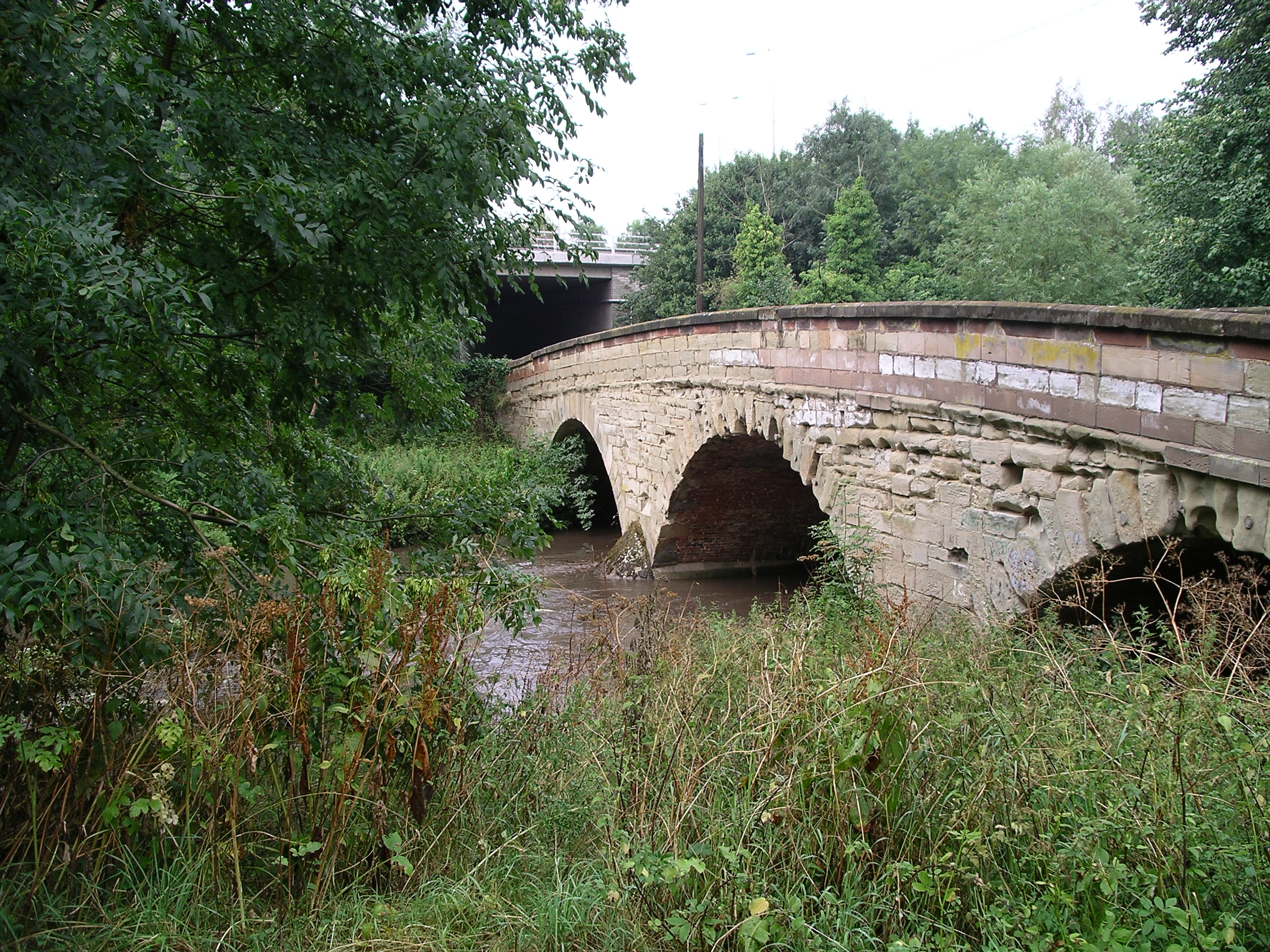
- The bridge over the River Sowe near the Mill in Baginton

Location
- Country: England
- Counties: Warwickshire, West Midlands

Physical characteristics
- Source
  - location: Hookham
- Mouth: River Avon
  - location: Stoneleigh
  - coordinates: 52°20′55″N 1°31′31″W

The River Sowe is a river in Warwickshire and West Midlands, England. It is a tributary of the River Avon, and flows into it just south of Stoneleigh about 5 miles (8 km) south of Coventry. The Sowe is about 12 miles (19 km) long.

The Sowe rises in Bedworth 5.5 miles (9 km) to the north of Coventry. Its route takes it through Exhall near to Junction 3 of the M6 motorway and the A444 road, to the northern and then the eastern suburbs of Coventry, in particular the districts of Longford, Wood End, Walsgrave, Binley, Ernesford Grange, Willenhall and near the village of Baginton. Near Baginton the river has a large steep bank on its southern side and the remains of the Roman Lunt Fort have been found at the top of this bank.

The Sowe Valley Footpath runs alongside the river for 8½ miles from Hawkesbury Junction Conservation Area to Stonebridge Meadows Local Nature Reserve. It also runs through Wyken Slough Local Nature Reserve, Wyken Croft Nature Park and Stoke Floods Local Nature Reserve.

The grade II-listed Sowe Viaduct carries the Coventry-Rugby railway line across the river.

== Crossings ==
In downstream order from source; listed or notable bridges and A-roads/motorways only:

- A444 Bedworthy Bypass
- M6 motorway (junction 3 flyover)
- A444 road
- River is culverted under the Coventry Canal, Coventry to Nuneaton railway line, and an industrial estate
- A4600 Ansty Road
- Access road to University Hospital Coventry
- A4600 Ansty Road
- A428 Binley Road
- A4082 Allard Way (twice; the road spans a meander)
- Sowe Viaduct
- A45 Stonebridge Highway
- Baginton Bridge (grade II)
- Stoneleigh Bridge (grade II and scheduled monument)

== Gallery ==
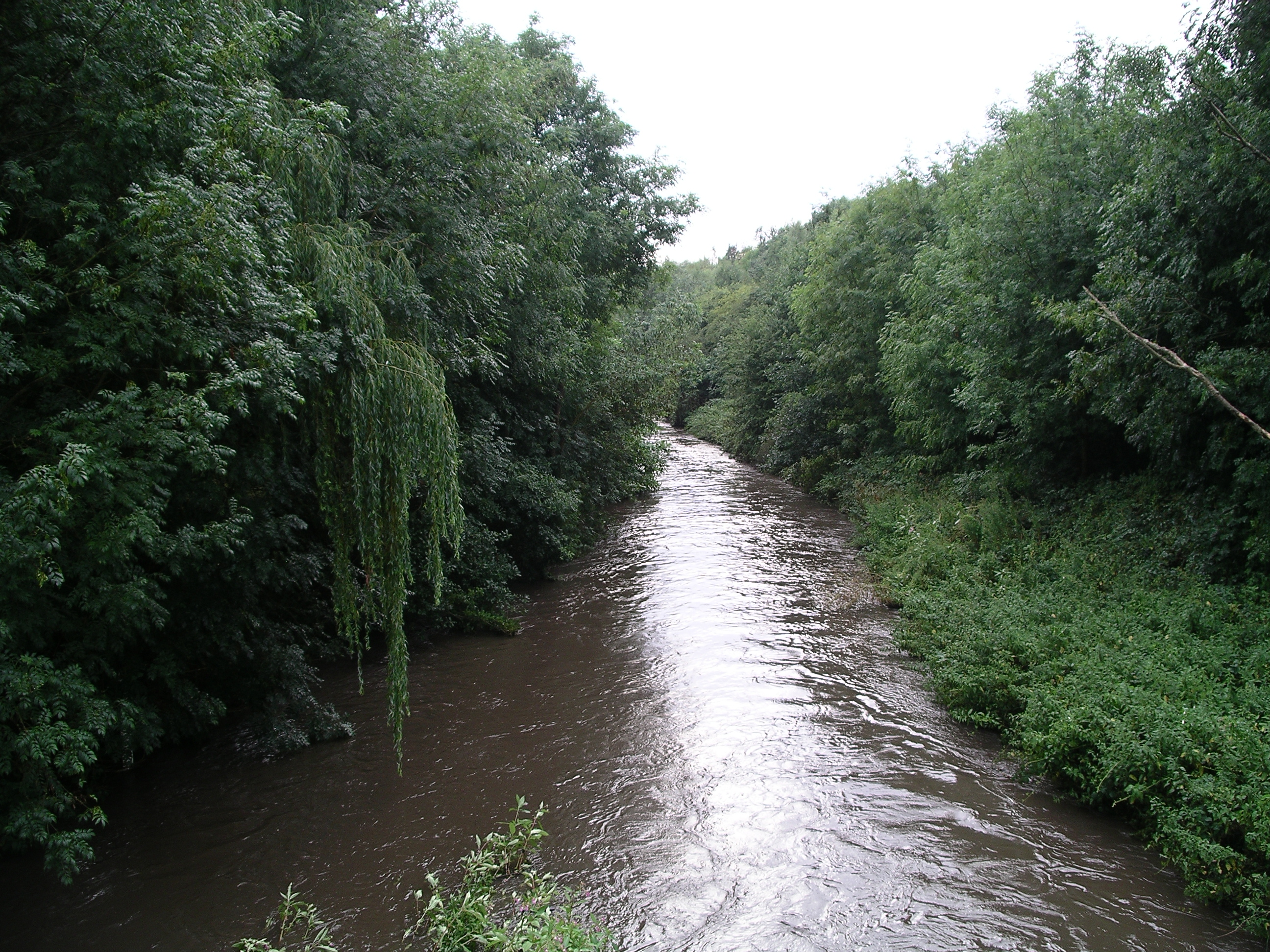
View downstream from the bridge over River Sowe near the Mill in Baginton.

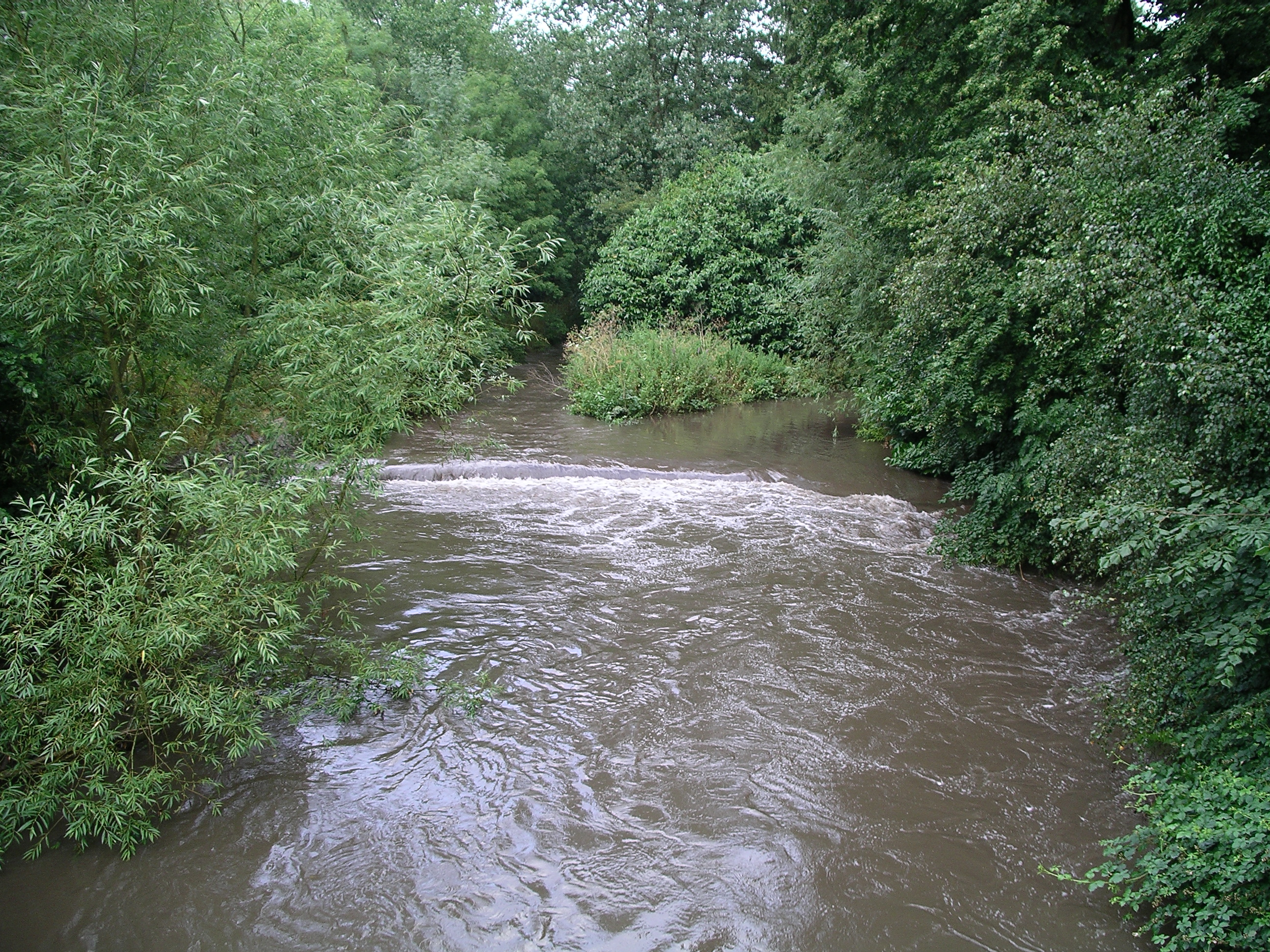
View upstream from the Baginton bridge showing the small weir and the union of the main river with a small diverted waterway from the Mill.

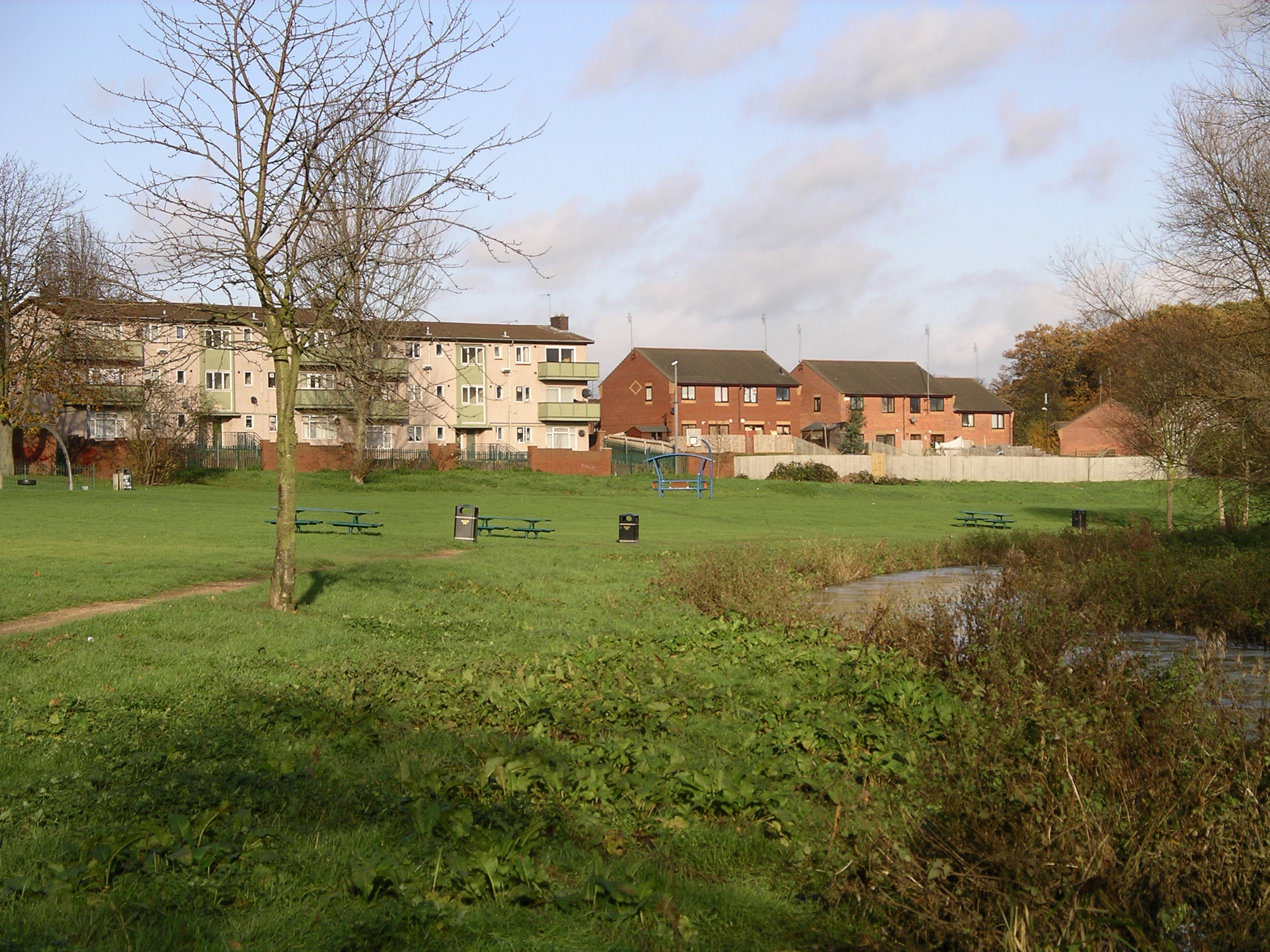
Stoke Aldermoor and Pinley Fields by the River Sowe.
