= Sherbourne Viaduct =

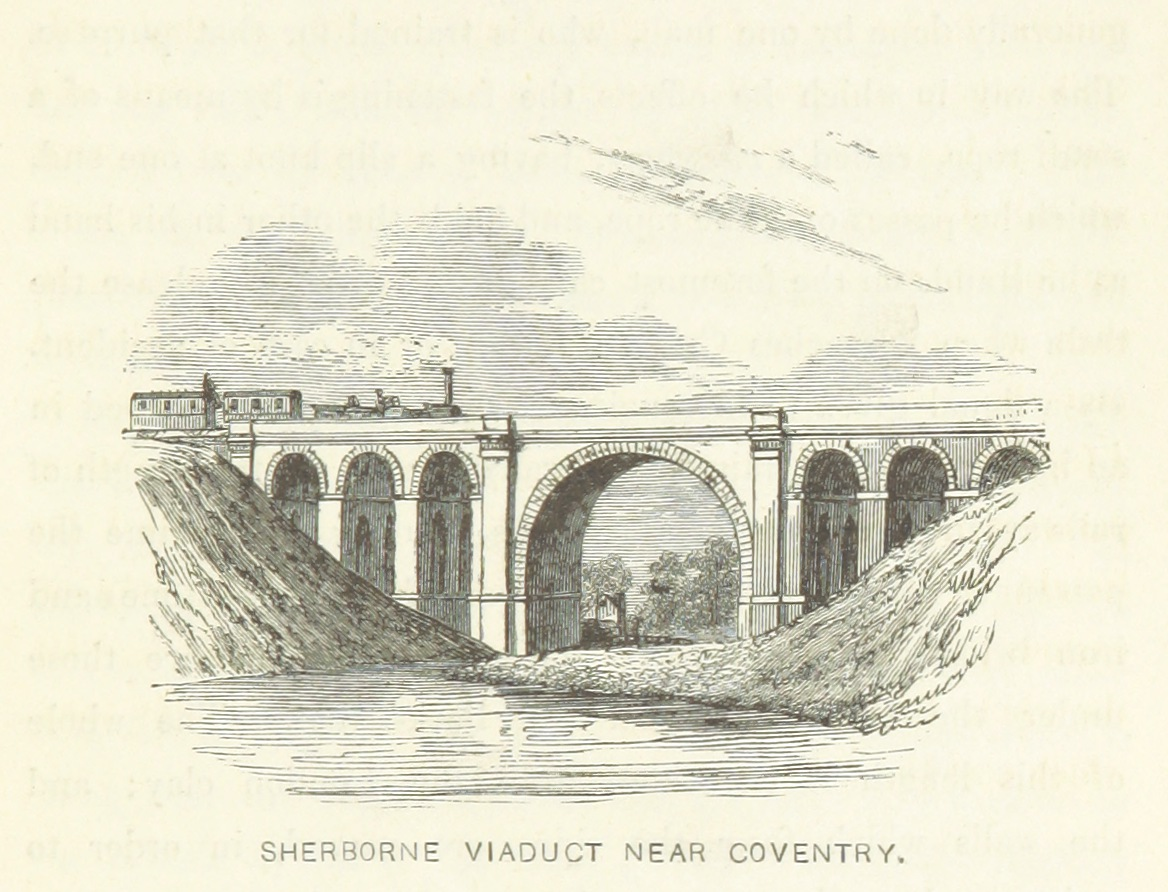
- The bridge as depicted by Roscoe, 1839
- Coordinates: 52°23′49″N 1°29′28″W
- Carries: Birmingham Loop
- Crosses: River Sherbourne
- Locale: Coventry, England
- Maintained by: Network Rail
- Heritage status: Grade II listed building

History
- Construction end: 1838

The Sherbourne Viaduct is a railway bridge that carries the Birmingham Loop line across the River Sherbourne in Coventry, central England. Built in 1838, it is a grade II listed building.

== Description ==
The Sherbourne Viaduct is located to the south east of Coventry city centre on the Birmingham Loop line on the route to Rugby. By road, it is east of the A4114 London Road. The viaduct is built from red brick. It consists of one large central arch over the river flanked by three much smaller arches on either side. The bridge has a cornice and string course decoration which, along with the arches, are dressed in ashlar. Smaller, pointed, arches are cut into the piers of the ancillary arches. The main arch is supported by very large pilasters and similar pilasters are found at the terminating ends of the ancillary arches.

== History ==
The viaduct was built in 1838 by Robert Stephenson, chief engineer to the London and Birmingham Railway. It is still in use as part of the Birmingham Loop line. Much of the line was quadrupled in the 1960s but this work only went as far north as Rugby, meaning the Sherbourne Viaduct and other structures between Rugby and Coventry are in largely as-built condition. The Sherbourne Viaduct is one of several engineering works illustrated by John Cooke Bourne in his Series of Lithographic Drawings on the London and Birmingham Railway and was the subject of another lithograph 1839. It was designated at grade II listed building in December 2015. It was listed for its age and its importance as a "skilful handling of the challenge of crossing the River Sherbourne", and for the involvement of Stephenson, "one of the most important transport engineers of the 19th century". Several other railway-related structures in Coventry were listed at the same time: (from east to west) the Sowe Viaduct, the portals of Humber Road Tunnel, and Mile Lane Bridge.

In 2018, proposals were put forward to turn the lands around the Charterhouse, including the footpath along the Sherbourne and under the viaduct into a public park, which would make the viaduct less secluded and allow it to be better appreciated.

== See also ==
- Spon End Viaduct, another railway viaduct over the Sherbourne further west
