= Sowe Viaduct =

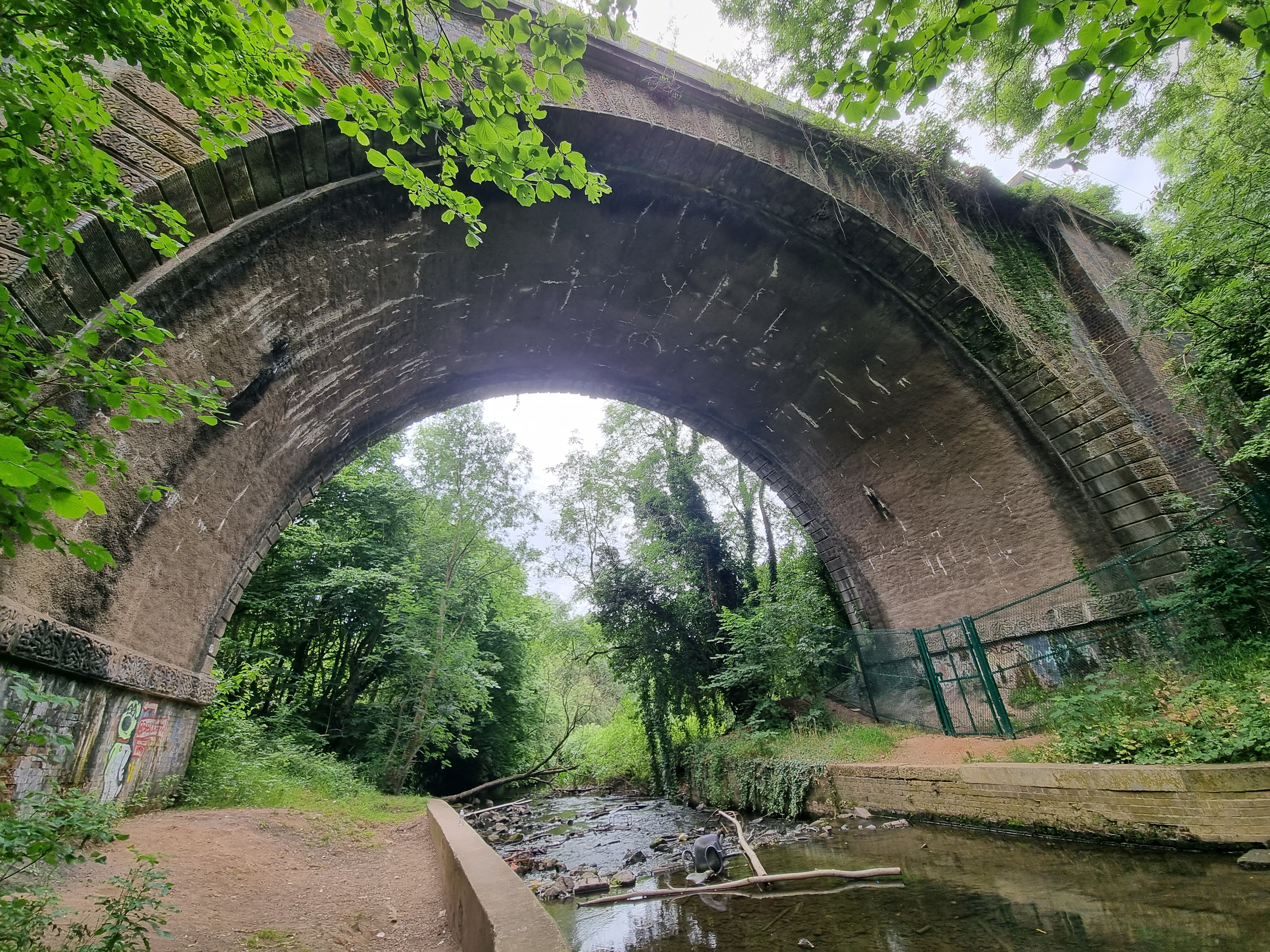
- Coordinates: 52°23′32″N 1°27′54″W
- Carries: Birmingham Loop
- Crosses: River Sowe
- Locale: Coventry, England
- Maintained by: Network Rail
- Heritage status: Grade II listed building

History
- Construction end: 1838

Location
- Interactive map of Sowe Viaduct

The Sowe Viaduct is a railway bridge on the Birmingham Loop line crossing the River Sowe at the south-eastern edge of Coventry in central England. Built in 1838, it is a Grade II listed building.

== Description ==
The bridge carries the Birmingham Loop railway line across the River Sowe, a tributary of the Avon. It is oriented roughly east to west and located between Coventry and Rugby, on the outskirts of the city. By road, it is just east of the A4082. It consists of one main arch flanked by three much smaller arches on each side. The bridge is built from red brick with stone dressings to the arches. The arches have substantial voussoirs. Within the piers supporting the ancillary arches, smaller arches are cut. The structure is decorated with vermiculation and string course with a cornice that runs the length of the bridge. The main arch is flanked by giant pilasters; similar pilasters mark both ends of the viaduct. The bridge has many patches of blue engineering brick, evidence of previous repairs.

== History ==
The viaduct was built in 1838 by Robert Stephenson, chief engineer to the London and Birmingham Railway. It is still in use as part of the Birmingham Loop line. Much of the line was quadrupled in the 1960s but this work only went as far north as Rugby, meaning the Sowe Viaduct and other structures between Rugby and Coventry are in a largely as-built condition. The Sowe Viaduct is one of several engineering works illustrated by John Cooke Bourne in his Series of Lithographic Drawings on the London and Birmingham Railway. It was designated a Grade II listed building in December 2015. It was listed for its age and its importance as a "skilful handling of the challenge of crossing the River Sowe", and for the involvement of Stephenson, "one of the most important transport engineers of the 19th century". Several other railway-related structures in Coventry were listed at the same time: (from east to west) the Sherbourne Viaduct, the portals of Humber Road Tunnel, and Mile Lane Bridge.
