= Flying arch =

Arch bridge only designed to resist horizontal compression

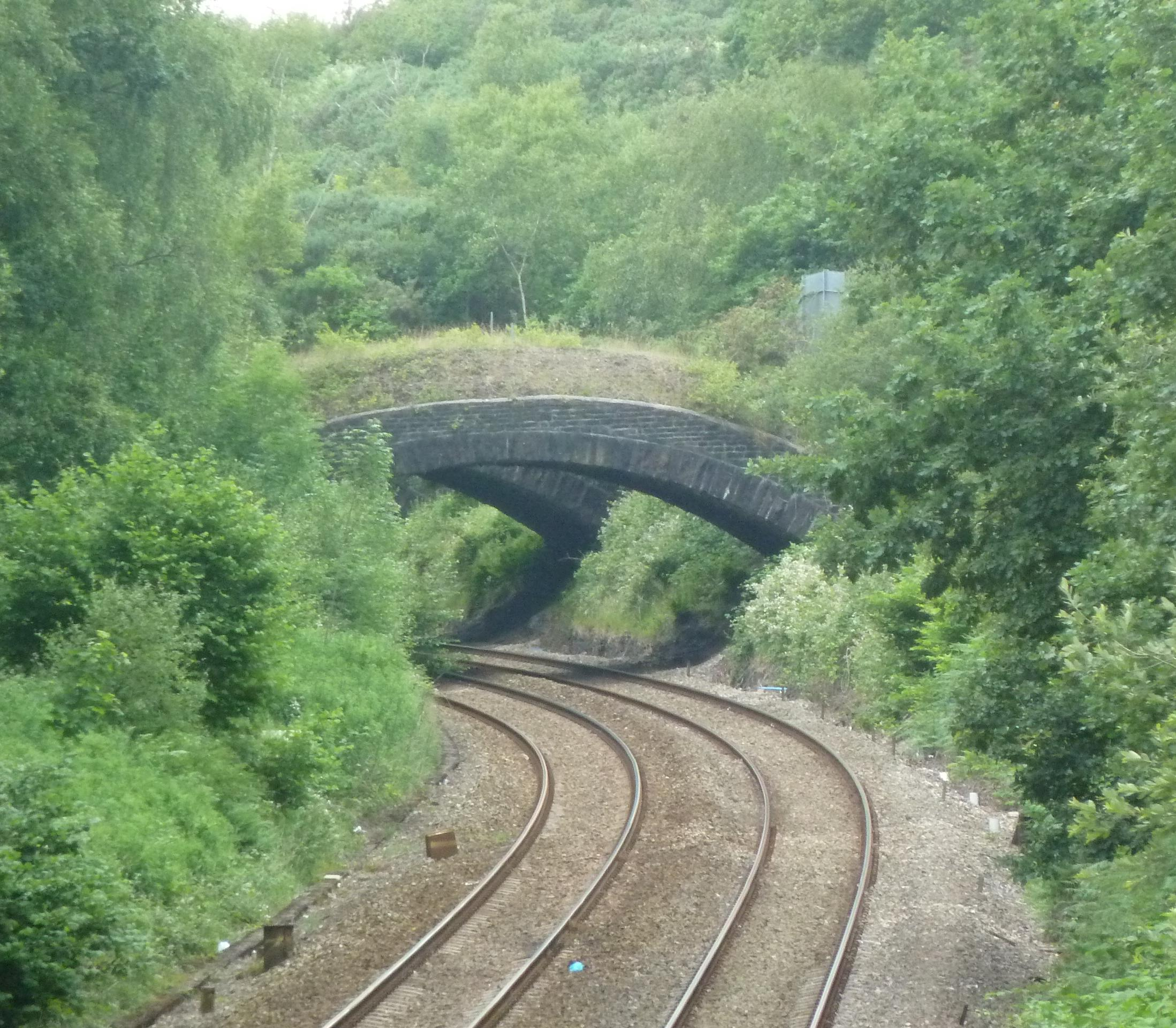
Two flying arches at Llansamlet in Wales, designed by Isambard Kingdom Brunel

In architecture or civil engineering, a flying arch is a form of arch bridge that does not carry any vertical load, but is built solely to provide outward horizontal forces, to resist an inwards compression. They are used across cuttings to prevent them from collapsing inwards.

== Operation ==
The conventional arch supports a vertical load downwards on the centre of the arch and translates this into forces both downwards and outwards at the base of the arch. In most cases, this sideways force is a nuisance and must be resisted by either strong foundations or a further 'bowstring' girder, in the form of a tied-arch bridge.

In some cases though, originally for railway cuttings in loose rock, the sides of the cutting are unable to retain their own weight and tend to slide inwards. Flying arches may be provided to retain these side walls. Unlike the conventional arch, the flying arch does not carry a useful load, it is merely used to generate the side-thrust, which in this case is useful for restraining the side walls.

Flying arches are not a common solution to railway cuttings. For large cuttings in soft earth, a gentle slope is self-supporting in most conditions. In small cuttings, retaining walls are a more common solution, although the thick masonry required to construct these soon becomes expensive. Flying arches were often used, as at Llansamlet, where an initial cutting of gentle slopes was later considered to be unreliably stable and the arches were then added as a safety measure.

== Notable examples ==
Possibly the first flying arch bridges over a railway were on the London and Birmingham Railway (opened 1838), of which Mile Lane Bridge in Coventry survives. Other early examples can be found at Chorley, on the Bolton and Preston Railway, built in 1841. These were a series of narrow 25-foot (7.6 m) long, strut-like arches between two masonry retaining walls. The retaining walls constrained the side forces such that they could only act axially along the columns; between earth banks, such narrow arches would otherwise have been at risk of collapse from off-axis forces. In 2008 the original stone arches were replaced by steel during work to lower the running lines in order to create clearance for electrification work. The stone arches were subsequently restored atop the new steel structures in 2014. The 16 arches have been grade II listed since 1984, and Historic England's listing uses the term "strainer arches".

The South Wales Railway at Llansamlet, near Swansea, runs through a cutting designed by Isambard Kingdom Brunel. After a landslip in the opening year of 1850, Brunel then designed four 70-foot (21 m) flying arches to hold the cutting walls apart. For extra stability, these arches were ballasted with high mounds of copper slag, a dense waste product conveniently available locally. The four arches are now individually Grade II listed.

Just west of Swansea, the 829 yards (758 m) Cockett Tunnel suffered a partial collapse in 1899, long after Brunel's death. Some time after reconstruction, the Eastern end of the tunnel was opened out (reducing the length to 788 yards) and the resulting cutting supported by two brick-built flying arches.

== See also ==
- Flying buttress
- Counter-arch
- Inverted arch
