= Inverted arch =

Engineering structure to resist inward loads

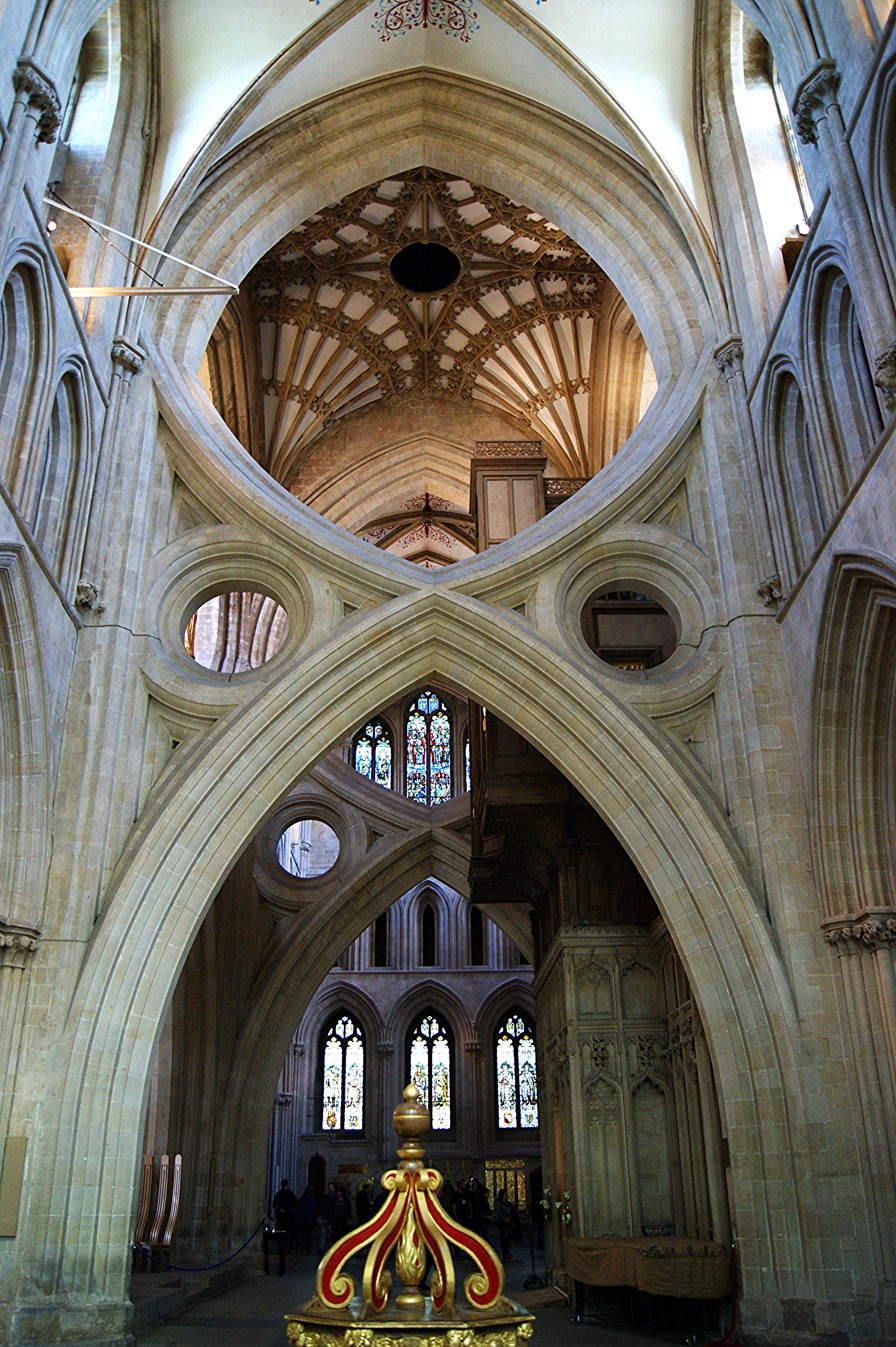
"Scissors" strainer arch arrangement in Wells Cathedral includes an inverted arch

An inverted arch or invert is a civil-engineering structure in the form of an inverted arch, inverted in comparison to the usual arch bridge.

Like the flying arch, the inverted arch is not usually used to support a load (with the exceptions of the foundations of the piers and retaining walls), as for a bridge, but rather to resist sideways, inwards loads. The conventional arch supports a vertical load downwards on the centre of the arch and translates this into forces both downwards and outwards at the base. In most cases, this sideways force is a nuisance and must be resisted by either strong foundations or a further "bowstring" girder, in the form of a tied-arch bridge.

Inverted arches are used where sideways forces must be restrained, and where space is most easily available beneath a construction (for example, the strainer arches are built as an afterthought, have to fit into the space available, and thus sometimes include the inverted components). They have often been applied to railway cuttings, but are perhaps most distinctively used as the bases of docks, particularly dry docks and locks that must be supported even when they are empty of water that could otherwise resist the sidethrust of their walls. Some canal tunnels were built oval in section, such as the Newbold-on-Avon tunnel, where the lower section forms an invert for strength.

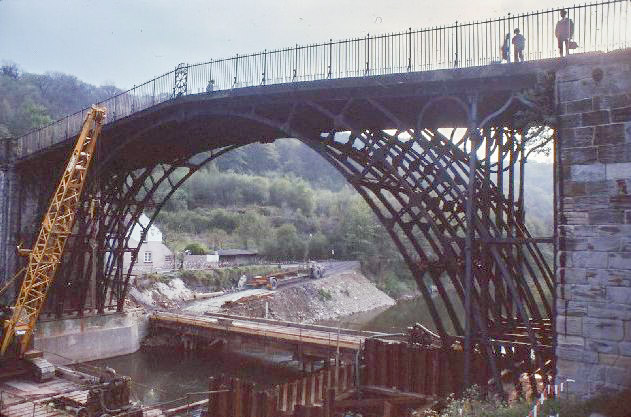
The Iron Bridge in Shropshire in 1974, during the construction of the concrete inverted arch

A further use of inverted arches is to support lengthways forces from another arch, such as a bridge or viaduct. This is often done on poor ground to reduce ground loading; otherwise there would be need for extensive foundations. In the simplest case, the arches simply spread the downwards loads of viaduct piers into a wider ground area, exactly as for an inverted arch bridge. Such arches were used beneath the Hownes Gill Viaduct, on the advice of Robert Stephenson. Inverted arches have also been added to existing bridges, to reinforce them after their banks start to slide inwards. Such a repair was applied to The Iron Bridge in the 1970s.

Inverted arches are often used in conjunction with retaining walls. The arch provides a foundation for the walls and can resist the sideways forces upon them. The retaining wall also provides the vertical load needed by the arch. They are also used as foundations for piers in order to distribute loads over the areas between the piers.

== See also ==
- Counter-arch

== Sources ==
- Audsley, W.; Audsley, G.A. (1881). "Arch". Popular Dictionary of Architecture and the Allied Arts: A Work of Reference for the Architect, Builder, Sculptor, Decorative Artist, and General Student. With Numerous Illustrations from All Styles of Architecture, from the Egyptian to the Renaissance. Popular Dictionary of Architecture and the Allied Arts: A Work of Reference for the Architect, Builder, Sculptor, Decorative Artist, and General Student. G. P. Putnam's sons. pp. 24–39.
- Woodman, Francis; Bloom, Jonathan M. (2003). "Arch". Oxford Art Online. Oxford University Press. doi:10.1093/gao/9781884446054.article.t003657. ISBN 978-1-884446-05-4.
