= Mile Lane Bridge =

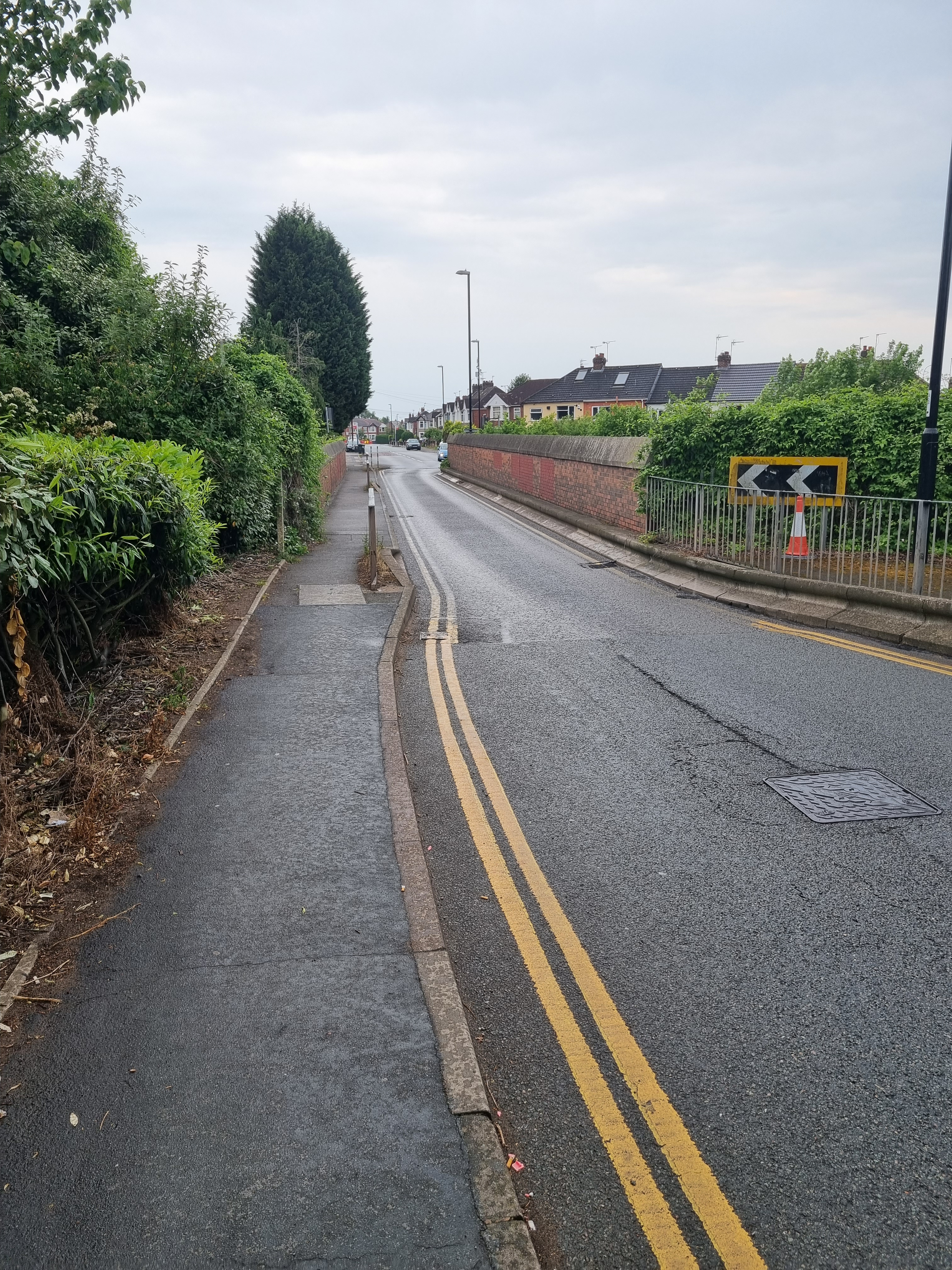
- The bridge deck
- Coordinates: 52°23′58″N 1°30′16″W
- Carries: Mile Lane
- Crosses: Birmingham Loop
- Locale: Coventry, England
- Maintained by: Network Rail
- Heritage status: Grade II listed building

Characteristics
- Design: Flying arch

History
- Construction end: 1838

Location
- Interactive map of Mile Lane Bridge

Mile Lane Bridge is a road-over-rail bridge in Coventry, central England. It is possibly the first use of a flying arch over a railway cutting and is a Grade II listed building.

== Description ==
Mile Lane runs roughly south from Coventry ring road and crosses the Rugby to Coventry section of the Birmingham Loop railway line to the south of Coventry city centre, near London Road Cemetery. The railway on the approach to Coventry is in a deep sandstone cutting. The bridge is a flying arch, meaning it has no abutments and instead springs directly from the cutting walls and the forces of the load on it are transferred to the walls, helping to restrain them. The bridge is built mostly from stone dug out from the cutting it crosses, with some use of brick. It is a single, elliptical, arch with irregular voussoirs and a roll cornice. The parapets are in the same stone but with modern brick to the inside faces and modern capping stones.

== History ==
The bridge dates from the opening of the London and Birmingham Railway (LBR) in 1838 and is believed to be the work of Robert Stephenson, the railway's chief engineer. Much of the line has been widened and modernised but the section between Rugby and Coventry is largely as-built and most of the original structures, including Mile Lane Bridge, survive. There are two similar bridges near Tile Hill, the other side of Coventry station; a third spanned the railway near Blisworth in Northamptonshire, further south, but does not survive. The four are believed to be the earliest flying arch bridges over a railway cutting.

It was designated at grade II listed building in December 2015. It was listed for its age as an original structure from one of the first major railway lines, and for its importance in engineering history as one of the earliest flying arches over a railway and the involvement of Stephenson, "one of the most important transport engineers of the 19th century". Several other railway-related structures in Coventry, all original features of the LBR, were listed at the same time: (from east to west) the Sowe Viaduct, the Sherbourne Viaduct, and the portals of Humber Road Tunnel.
