= Strainer arch =

Architectural feature to strengthen a building

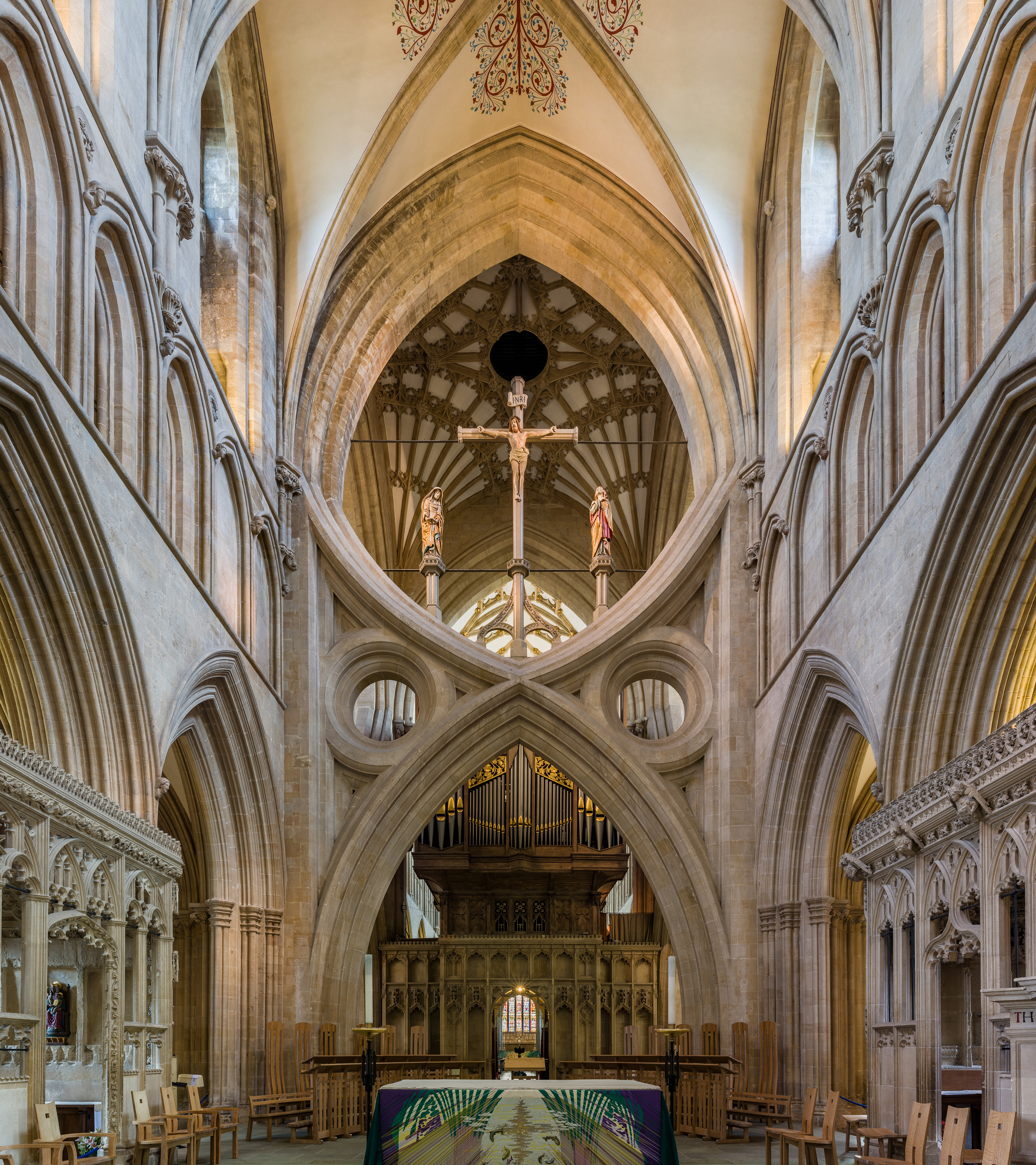
"Scissors" strainer arch arrangement in Wells Cathedral includes an inverted arch at the bottom of the upper opening

A strainer arch (also straining arch) is an internal structural arch built to relieve the inward pressure off the spanned vertical supports (providing a "buttress", thus also called buttressing arches), usually as an afterthought to prevent the supports from imploding due to miscalculation. In the past they were frequently adorned with decoration, with one of the best examples provided by Wells Cathedral. Strainer arches can be "inverted" (upside-down) while remaining structural.

The typical construction of Romanesque and Gothic churches includes east-to-west arcades, where each arch is buttressed by its neighbours. At the centre of the church, however, where the transepts intersect with the nave, the columns lack support and tend to buckle. This issue was exacerbated in English Gothic architecture by the fashion for raising a large tower above this most vulnerable point of the structure. A "spectacular" solution for the crossing buttressing issue at Wells Cathedral was found by William Joy (1338, 17 years after completion). A similar arrangement was added to both crossings of Salisbury Cathedral more than a century after the completion of most of the building, but shortly after the addition of a tower and spire (1380). The straining arches were added in the east-west direction, thus being unobtrusive when viewed from the nave. The arrangement at the east crossing (built in 1388) is similar to the one at Wells, while the great crossing uses a single-arch strainer design. John Wastell incorporated strainer arches in both the nave and crossing of Canterbury Cathedral, to take the load of his new Bell Harry tower. In Bristol Cathedral the strainer arches are used to carry the thrust from the central vault over the aisles, as in this hall church building the width of the aisles is half that of the nave, therefore the transverse forces cannot be balanced in an arcade-like fashion.

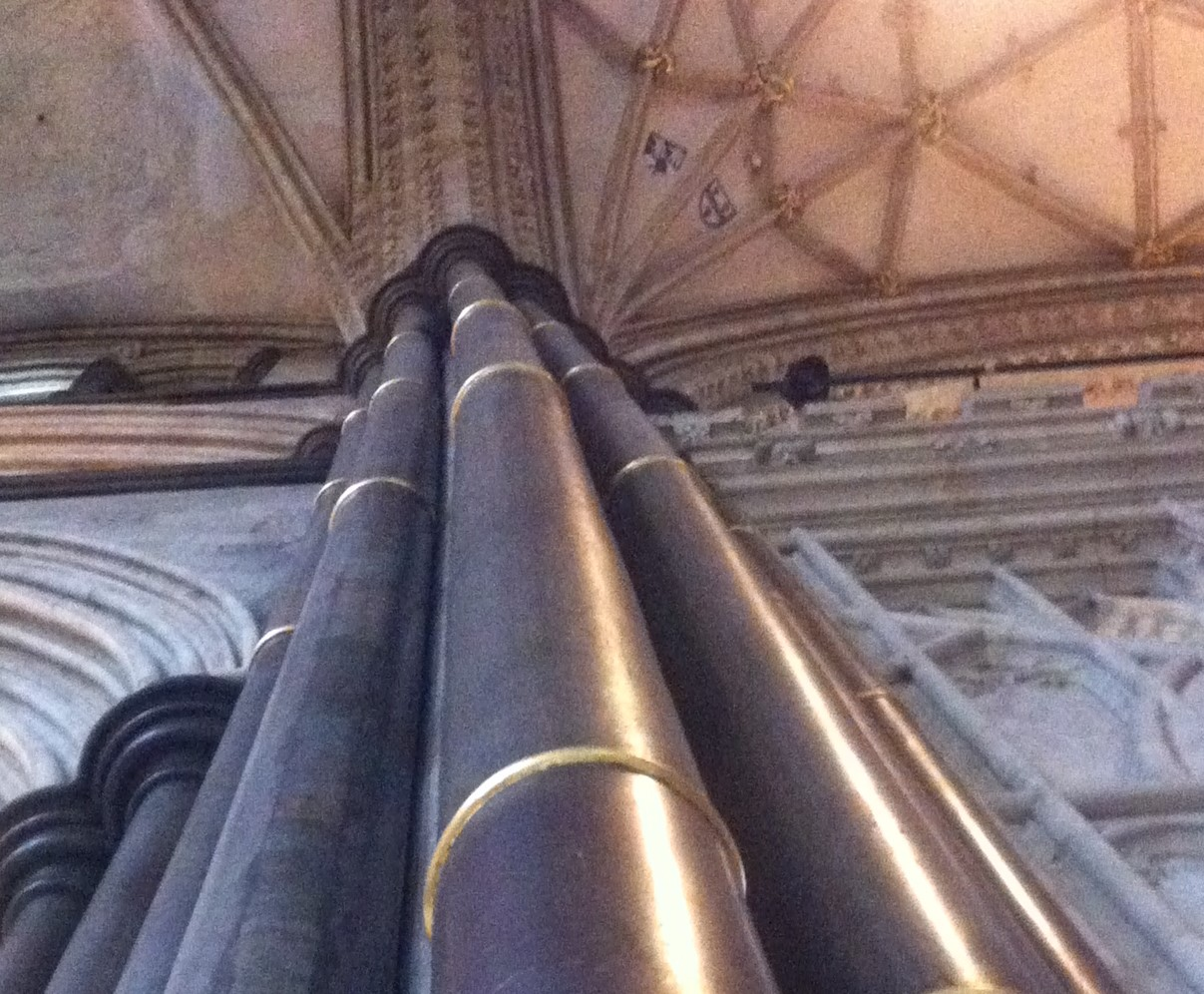
Pillars at the crossing of Salisbury Cathedral bending due to insufficient buttressing

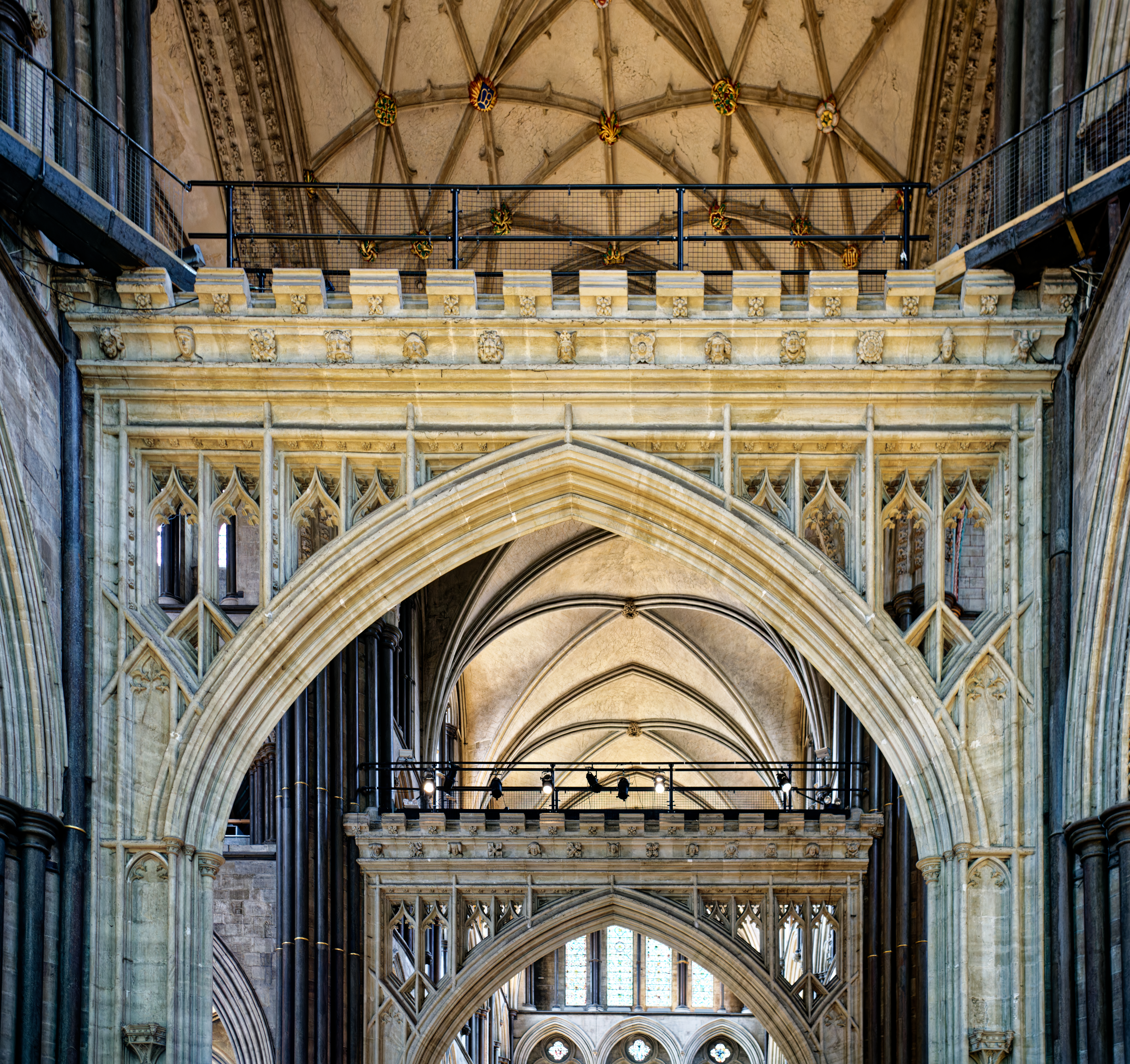
Strainer arches in the great crossing of Salisbury Cathedral

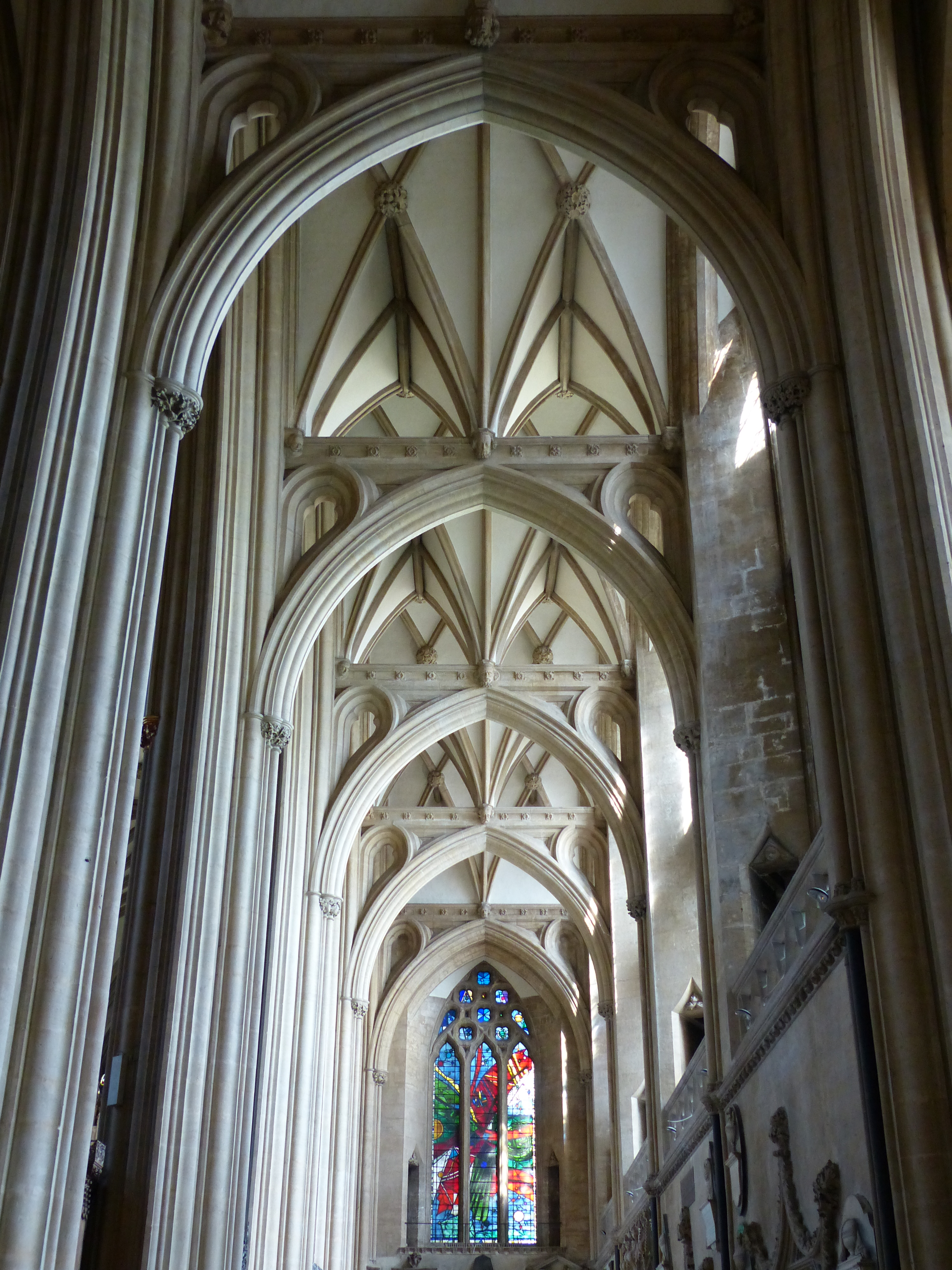
Strainer arches in an aisle of Bristol Cathedral

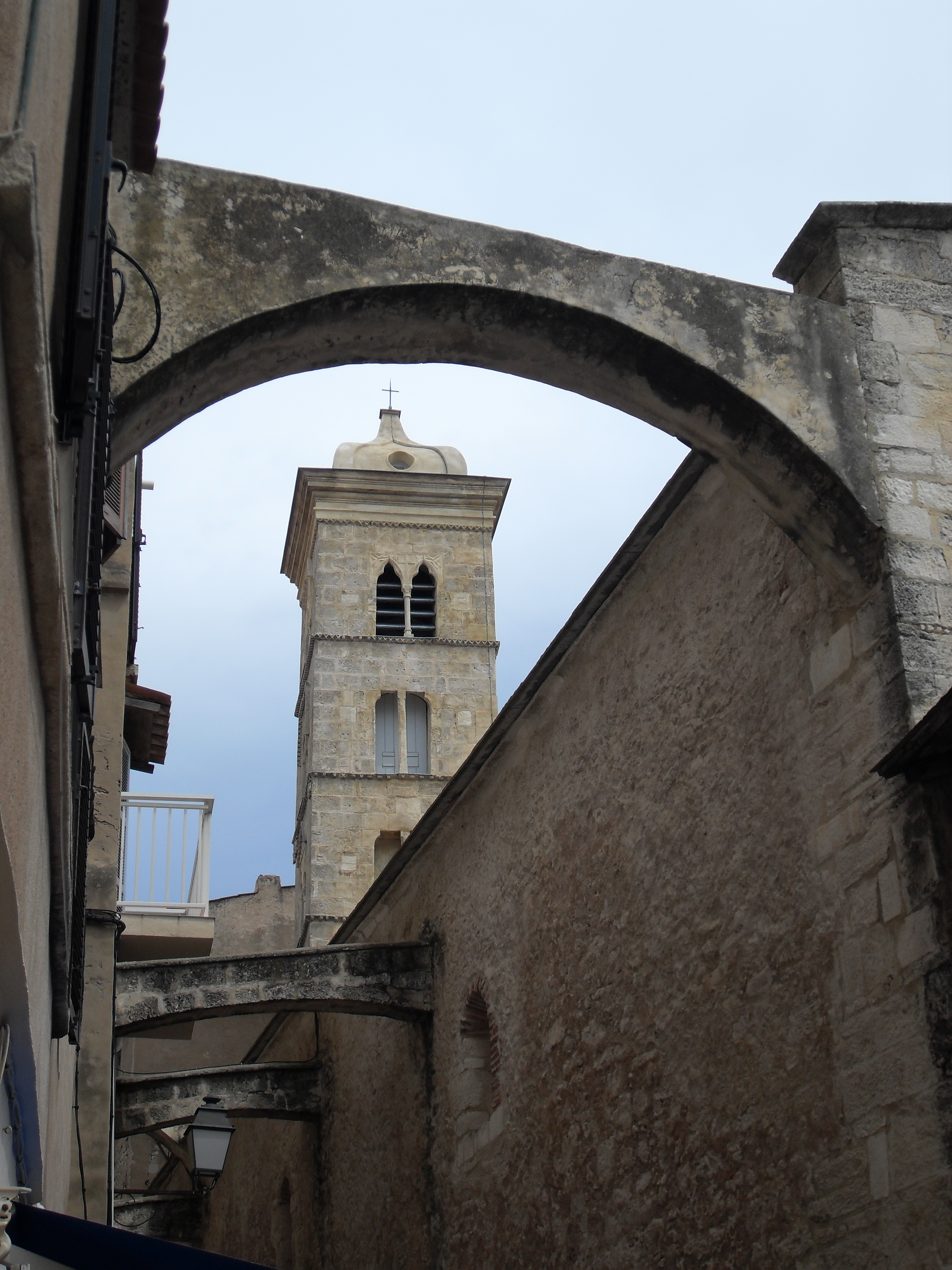
Buttressing arches in Bonifacio, Corsica

Red arrows highlight stone strainer arches at the crossing of Canterbury Cathedral

== See also ==
- Flying buttress, an outside arch built to relieve the horizontal thrust
- Girder, a horizontal support beam
- Flying arch, used in sites such as railway cuttings

== Sources ==
- Heyman, Jacques [in German] (2015). "Strainer arches". Construction History. 30 (2). The Construction History Society: 1–14. ISSN 0267-7768. JSTOR 44215905.
- Woodman, Francis; Bloom, Jonathan M. (2003). "Arch". Oxford Art Online. Oxford University Press. doi:10.1093/gao/9781884446054.article.t003657. ISBN 978-1-884446-05-4.
