= Hookham =

Hookham is a surname. Notable people with the surname include:

- John Hookham Frere (1769–1846), English diplomat and author
- Shenpen Hookham, English Buddhist teacher
- Thomas Hookham (c.1739–1819), English bookseller
- William Hookham Carpenter (1792–1866), English antiquary
