= Buttress =

Architectural structure

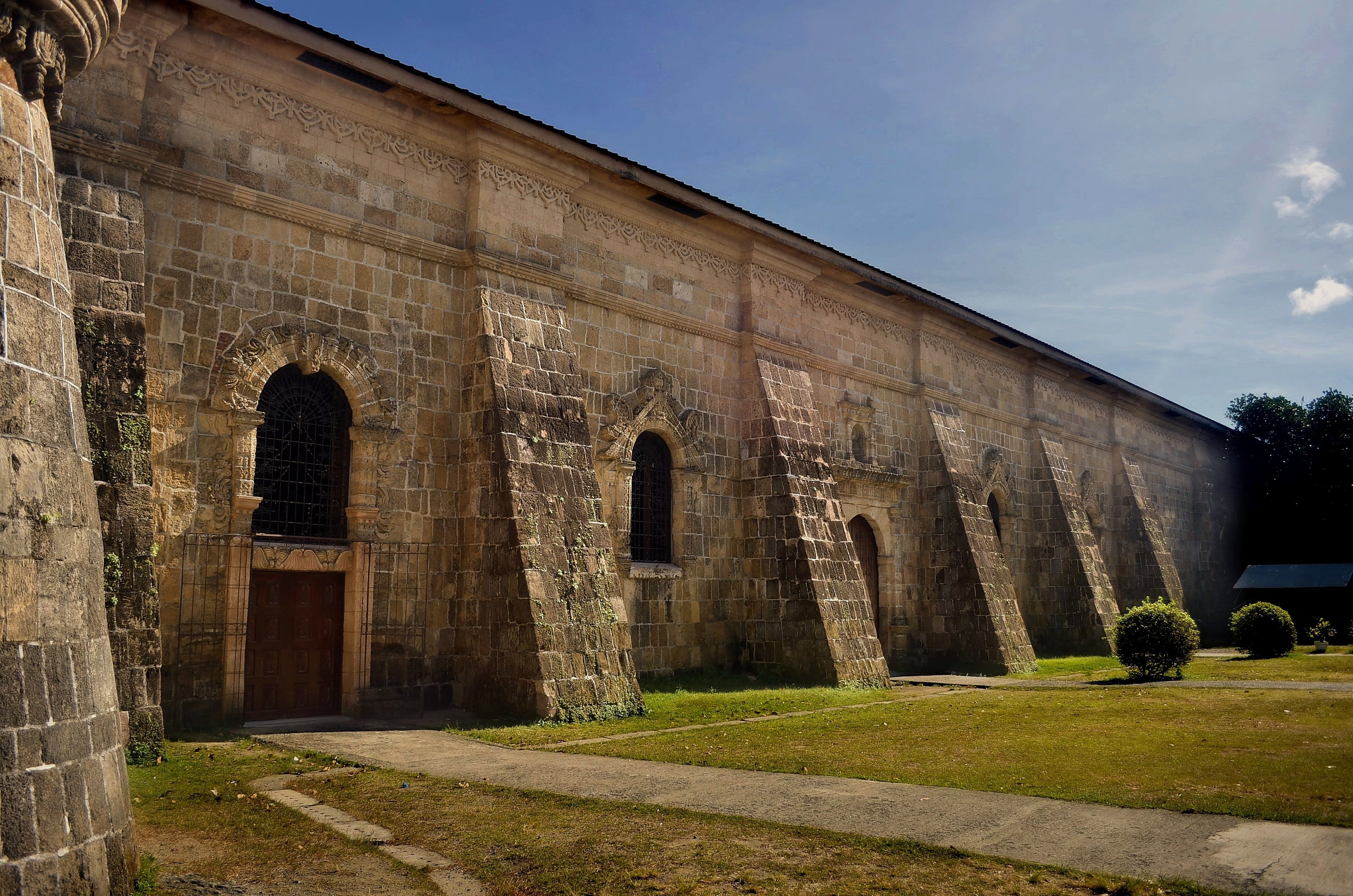
Buttresses of Miag-ao Church, Philippines

A buttress is an architectural structure built against or projecting from a wall which serves to support or reinforce the wall. Buttresses are fairly common on more historic (typically Gothic) buildings, as a means of providing support to act against the lateral (sideways) forces arising out of inadequately braced roof structures.

The term counterfort can be synonymous with buttress and is often used when referring to dams, retaining walls and other structures holding back earth.

Early examples of buttresses are found on the Eanna Temple (ancient Uruk), dating to as early as the 4th millennium BC.

== Terminology ==
In addition to flying and ordinary buttresses, brick and masonry buttresses that support wall corners can be classified according to their ground plan. A clasping, or clamped, buttress has an L-shaped ground plan surrounding the corner, an angled buttress has two buttresses meeting at the corner, a setback buttress is similar to an angled buttress but the buttresses are set back from the corner, and a diagonal, or French, buttress bisects the angle between the walls where they meet.

The gallery below shows top-down views of various types of buttress (dark grey) supporting the corner wall of a structure (light grey).

Buttress ground plans

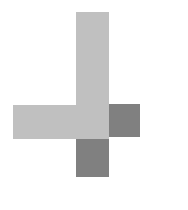
Angled buttress

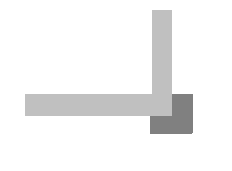
Clasping, or clamped, buttress

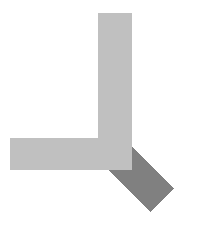
Diagonal, or French, buttress

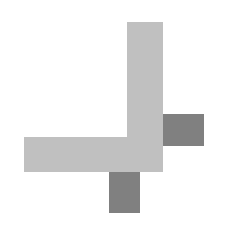
Setback buttress

== Gallery ==
Examples of Buttresses

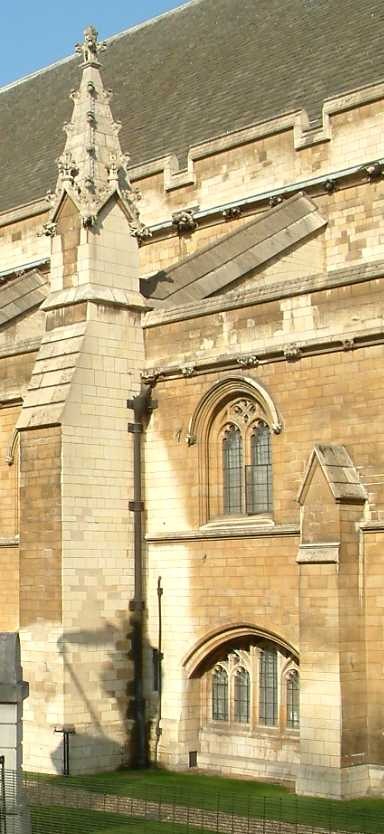
A buttress and a flying buttress, mostly concealed, supporting walls at the Palace of Westminster

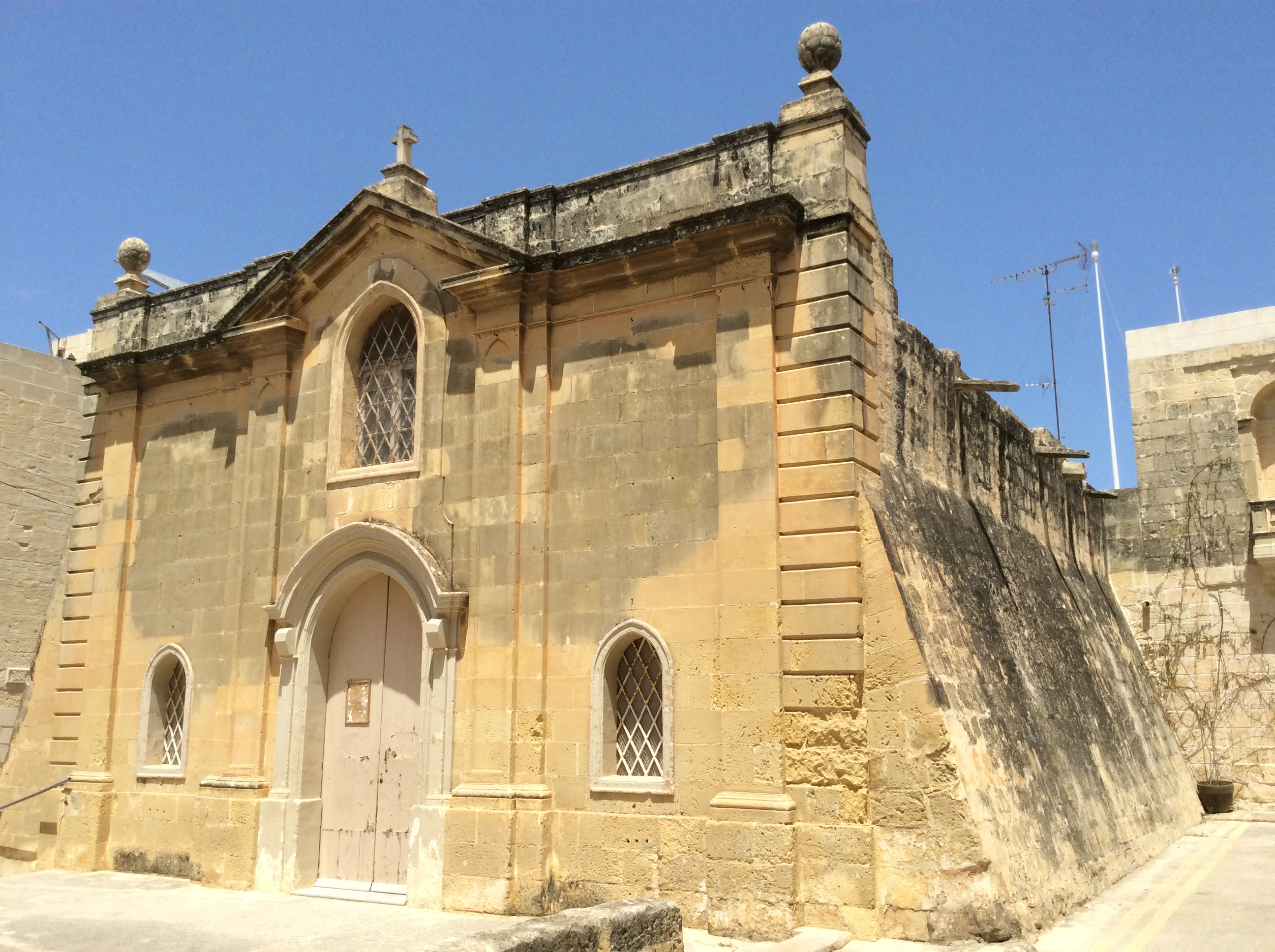
Buttress at Our Saviour's Chapel, Żejtun, Malta

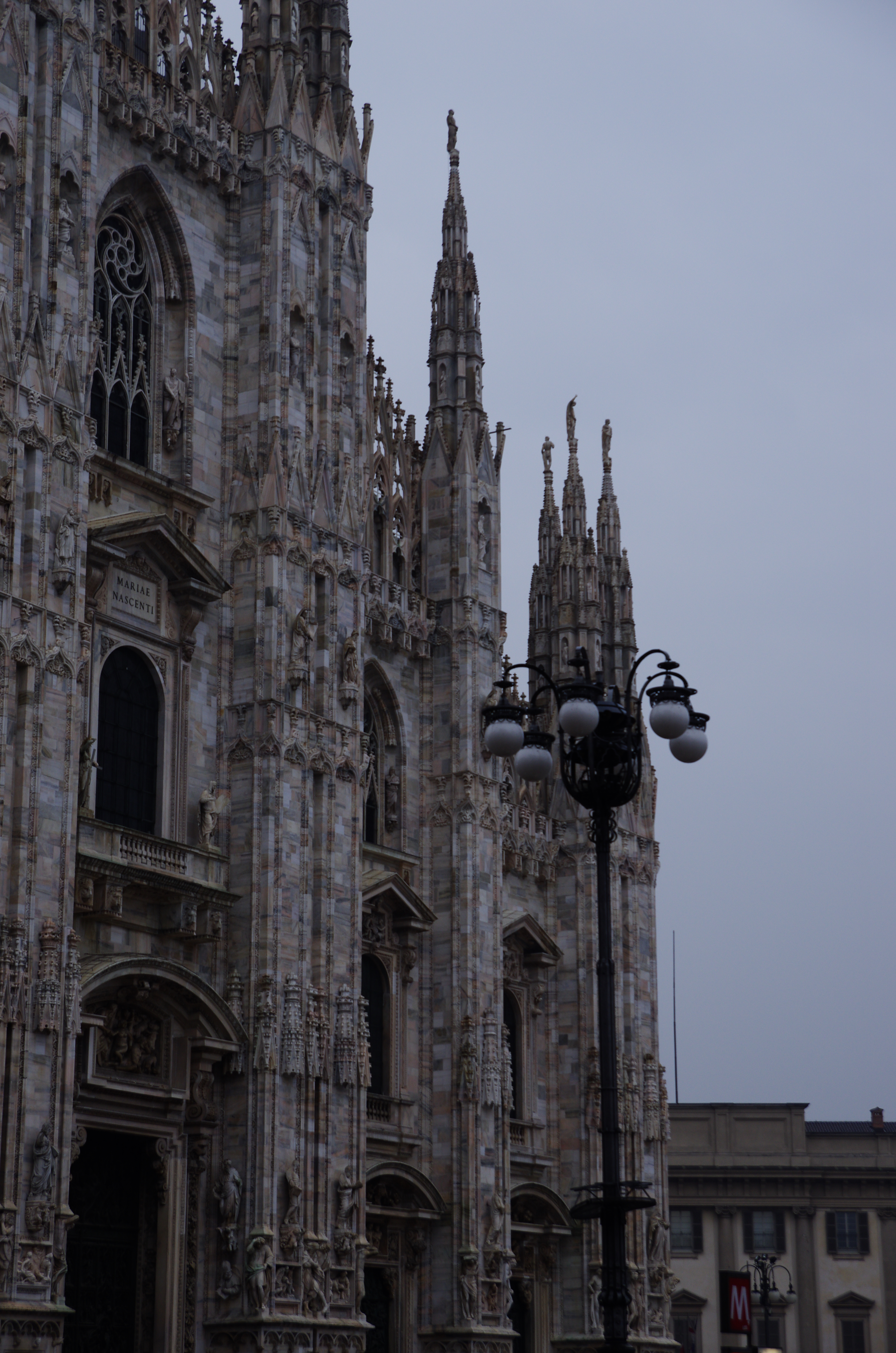
Façade buttresses at Milan Cathedral, Italy

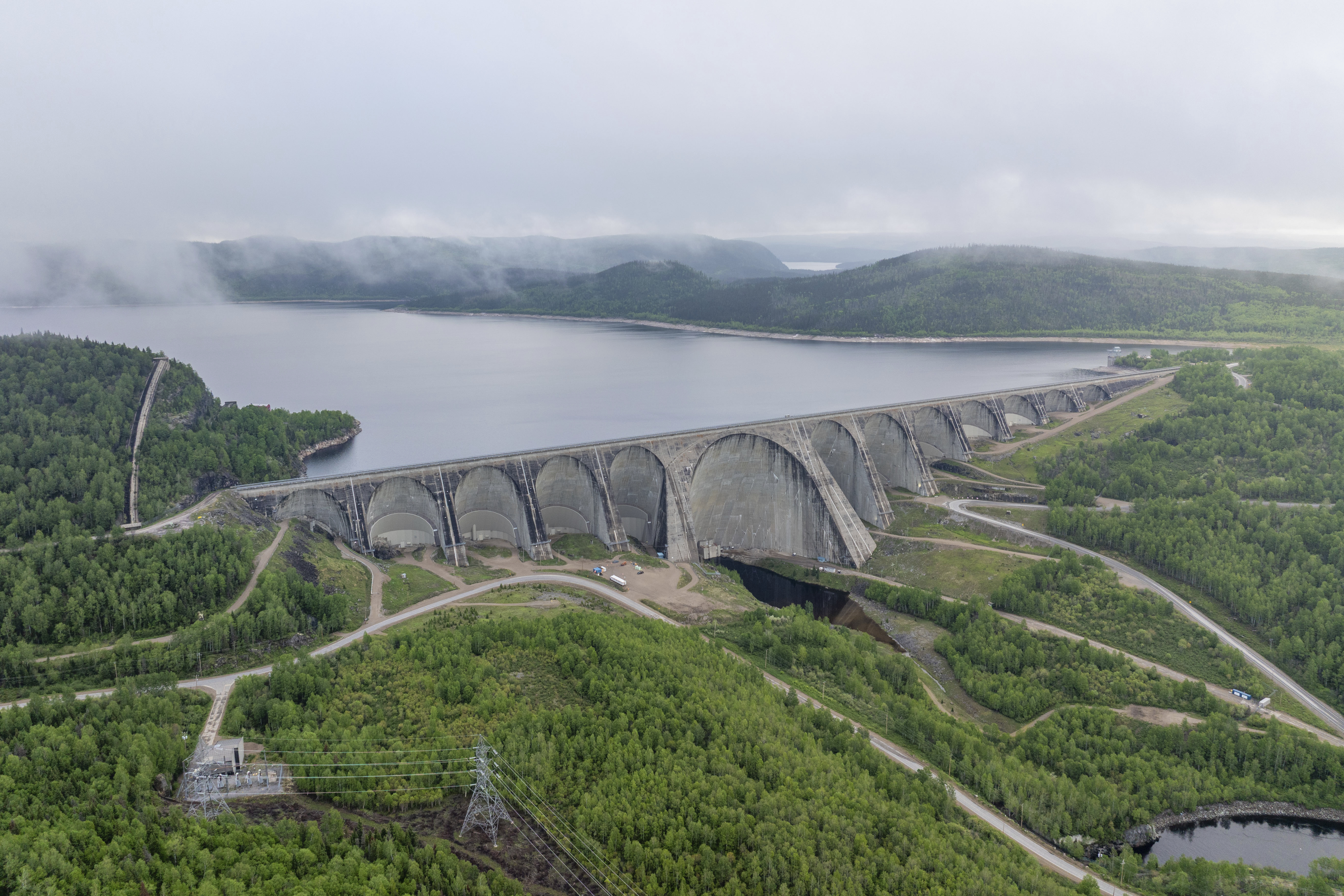
Buttresses on the 700ft tall Daniel-Johnson Dam, Quebec

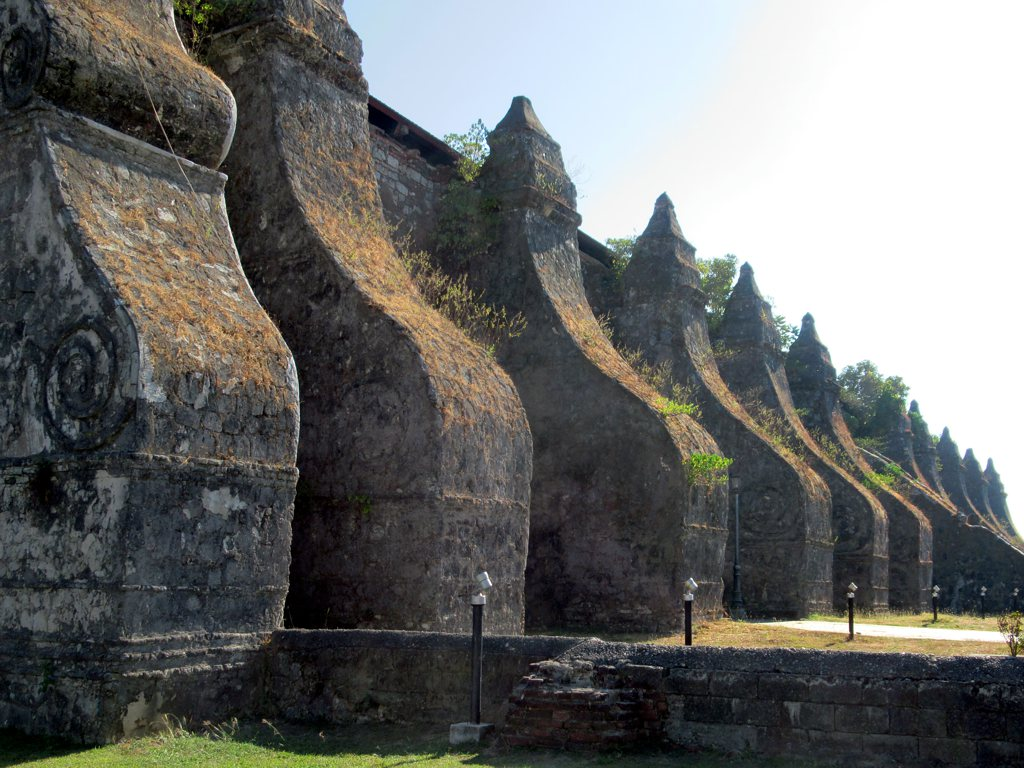
Thick buttresses characterize Earthquake Baroque architecture like Paoay Church, Philippines

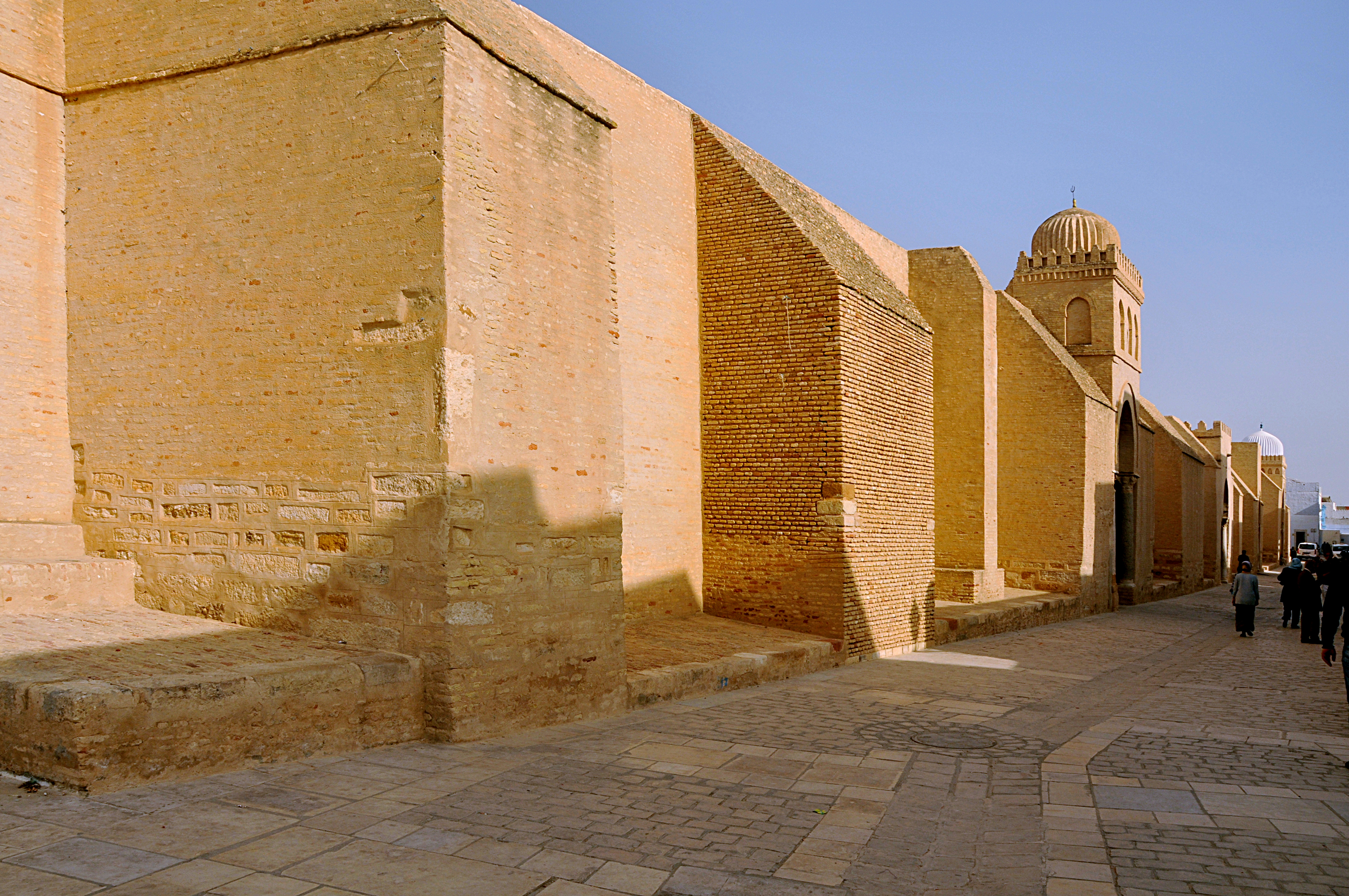
Buttresses of the western side of the Mosque of Uqba in Kairouan, Tunisia

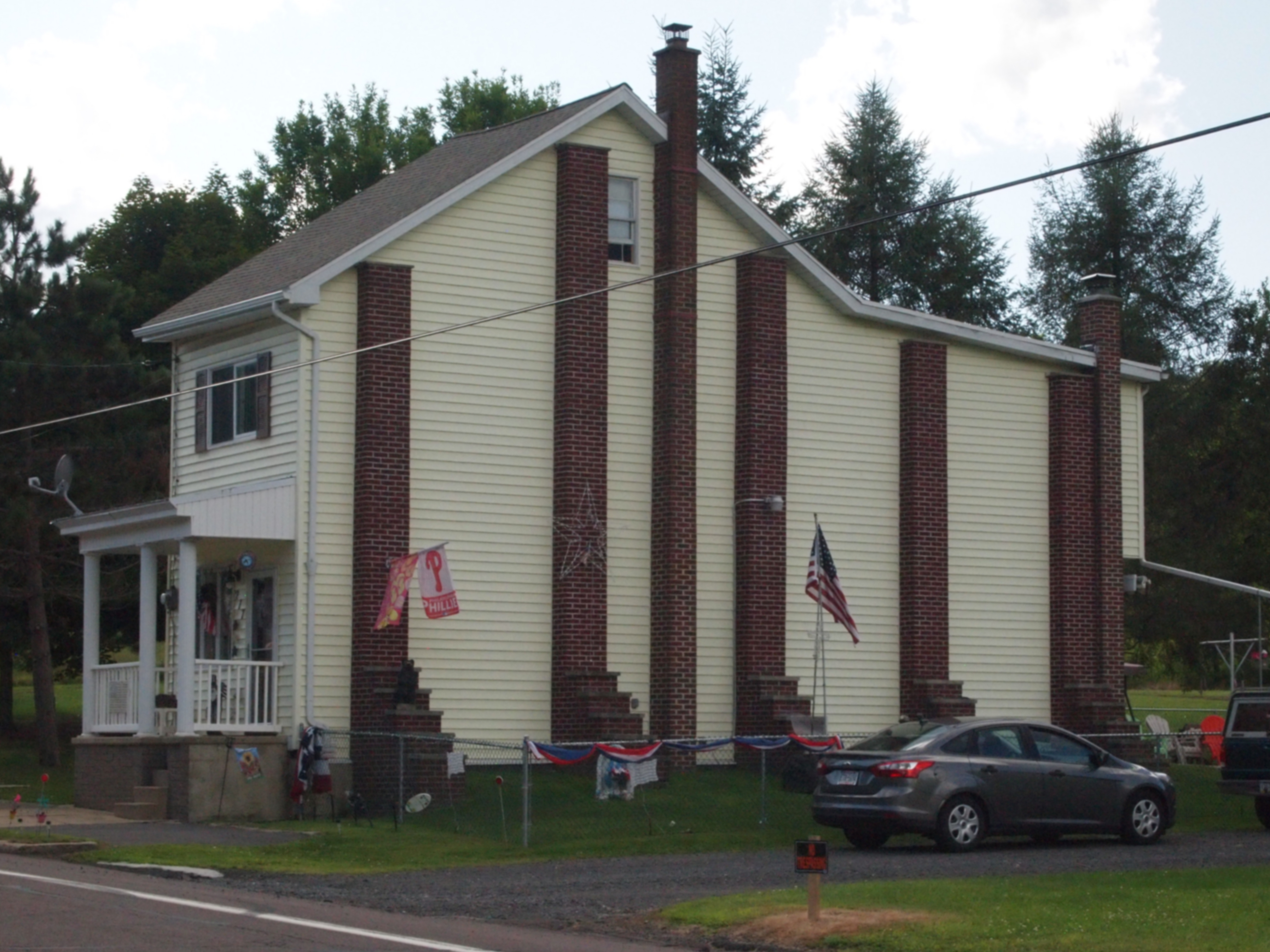
Buttresses to support the wall of this row house were constructed after its neighboring house was taken down as part of the Centralia mine fire.

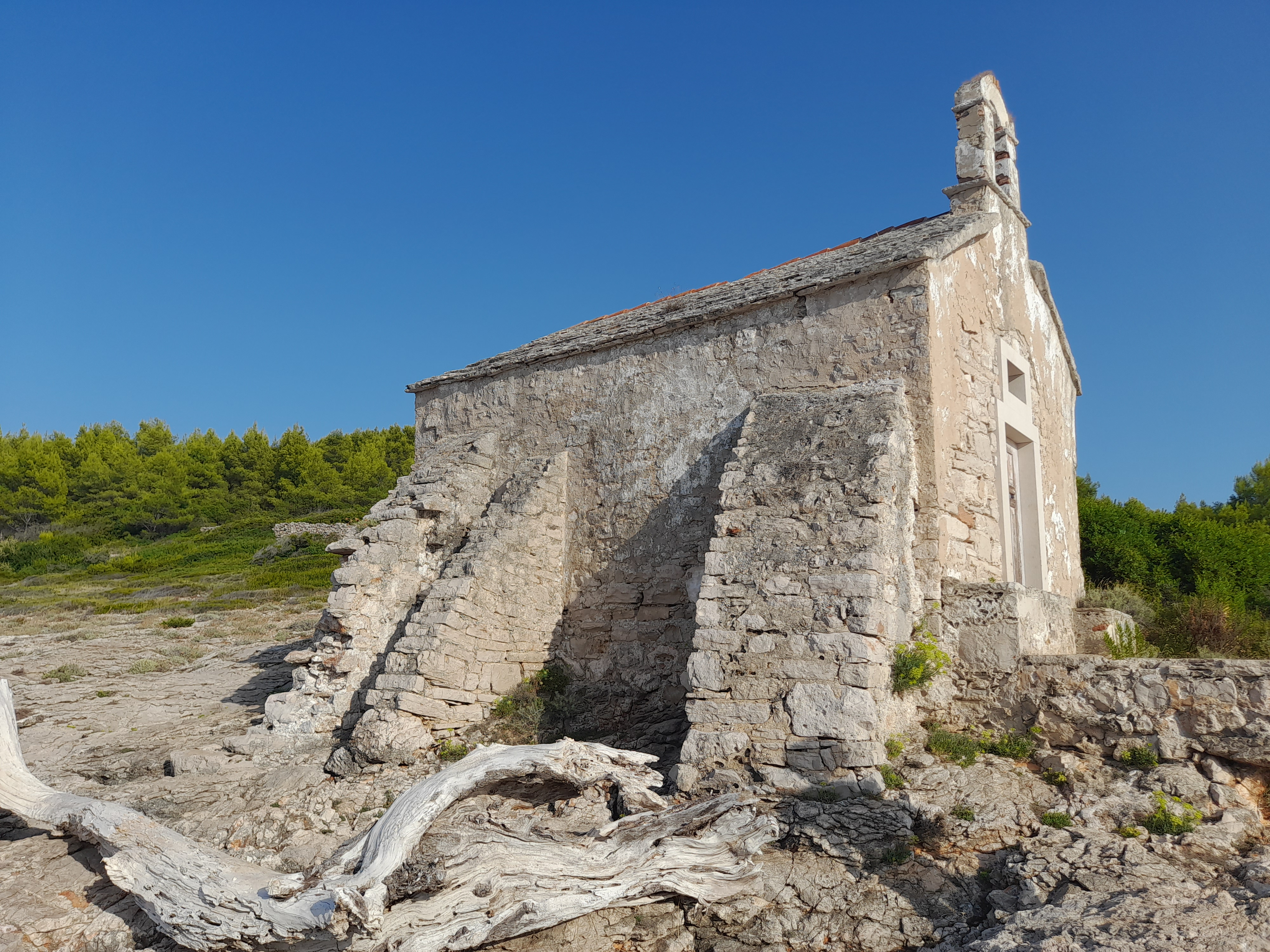
Buttresses supporting 14th-century chapel of St. Lucas near Jelsa, Croatia

== See also ==
- Cathedral architecture
- Flying buttress
- Strainer arch
- Pilaster
- Retaining wall
