= Michael Gibson (British Army soldier) =

Recipient of the George Cross

- Born: 21 June 1906; Chopwell, County Durham, England
- Died: 18 October 1940 (aged 34); Whitley Common, Coventry, England
- Burial place: London Road Cemetery, Coventry
- Military career
- Allegiance: United Kingdom
- Branch: British Army
- Service years: 1925–1940
- Rank: Sergeant
- Service number: 4445289
- Unit: Royal Engineers
- Conflicts: Second World War: Home Front; The Blitz †
- Awards: George Cross

Michael Gibson, GC (21 June 1906 – 18 October 1940) was a British Army soldier who was posthumously awarded the George Cross for the conspicuous gallantry he displayed in Coventry on 14 September 1940 in defusing a large unexploded bomb.

Prior to joining the Royal Engineers at the outset of the Second World War, Gibson was a miner in Chopwell, County Durham, and had served 14 years within the Territorial Army attached to the Durham Light Infantry.

== George Cross ==
Following a Luftwaffe bombing raid on the night of the 13/14 October 1940, two unexploded bombs were detected in a factory complex near Coventry. The area was evacuated and members of the 9th Bomb Disposal Company, Royal Engineers, including Gibson, were called in to defuse them.

The first detonated but no-one was hurt. Gibson and his men uncovered the second bomb beneath rubble but found the bomb to be hissing. Gibson sent his men away to safety and proceeded to defuse the bomb.

The posthumous award of the George Cross to Michael Gibson appeared in The London Gazette on 21 January 1941:

On 14 October 1940 a large unexploded bomb fell in an important factory. Excavation supervised by Sergeant Gibson was begun, during which time another bomb which had dropped nearby exploded. Despite the knowledge that the bomb on which he was engaged was of a similar type the N.C.O persevered and eventually the bomb was uncovered. On uncovering it an unusual hissing noise was heard coming from the bomb, whereupon Sergeant Gibson sent his men away and immediately set to work on the fuse. This he extracted safely and the bomb was eventually removed. His prompt and courageous action saved a very dangerous situation.

== Death ==
On 18 October 1940, Gibson was one of seven bomb disposal men that had recovered a 250 kilograms (550 lb) bomb from a Coventry housing estate. The still active bomb was transported via lorry to be defused at Whitley Common. The bomb exploded during unloading from the lorry, killing all of the men.

Following a funeral service at Coventry Cathedral on 25 October 1940, the squad were buried in a collective grave in Coventry's London Road Cemetery. The squad comprised Second Lieutenant Alexander Fraser Campbell and Sappers William Gibson, Richard Gilchrest, Jack Plumb, Ronald William Skelton, Ernest Arthur Stote and Gibson. Gibson was 34 when he was killed.

=== Memorial ===
On 18 October 2008, the anniversary of the death of Gibson and his fellow soldiers, a memorial plaque was dedicated to their memory close to where they died on Whitley Common.

The memorial reads:

In Memory of the Seven Men of the Royal Engineers 9th Bomb Disposal Company Who Lost Their Lives When an Unexploded German Bomb Removed from the City Centre Exploded Whilst Being Unloaded Near This Spot for De-Fusing on Whitley Common on 18 October 1940:

- 2nd Lieutenant A. F. Campbell, G.C., Age 42
- Sgt. M. Gibson, G.C., Age 34
- Sapper W. Gibson, Age 22
- Sapper R. Gilchrist, Age 23
- Sapper J. Plumb, Age 25
- Sapper R. W. Skelton, Age 20
- Driver E. F. Taylor, R.A.S.C., Age 32

Gibson's George Cross, Defence Medal and War Medal 1939-45 were sold at auction for £93,000 on 18 December 2012.

== Family ==
Michael Gibson married Elizabeth Hardy; they had two sons, Derek and John.
