= Blackstone, West Sussex =

Parish in West Sussex, England

Coordinates: 50.9312°N 0.235971°W

Blackstone
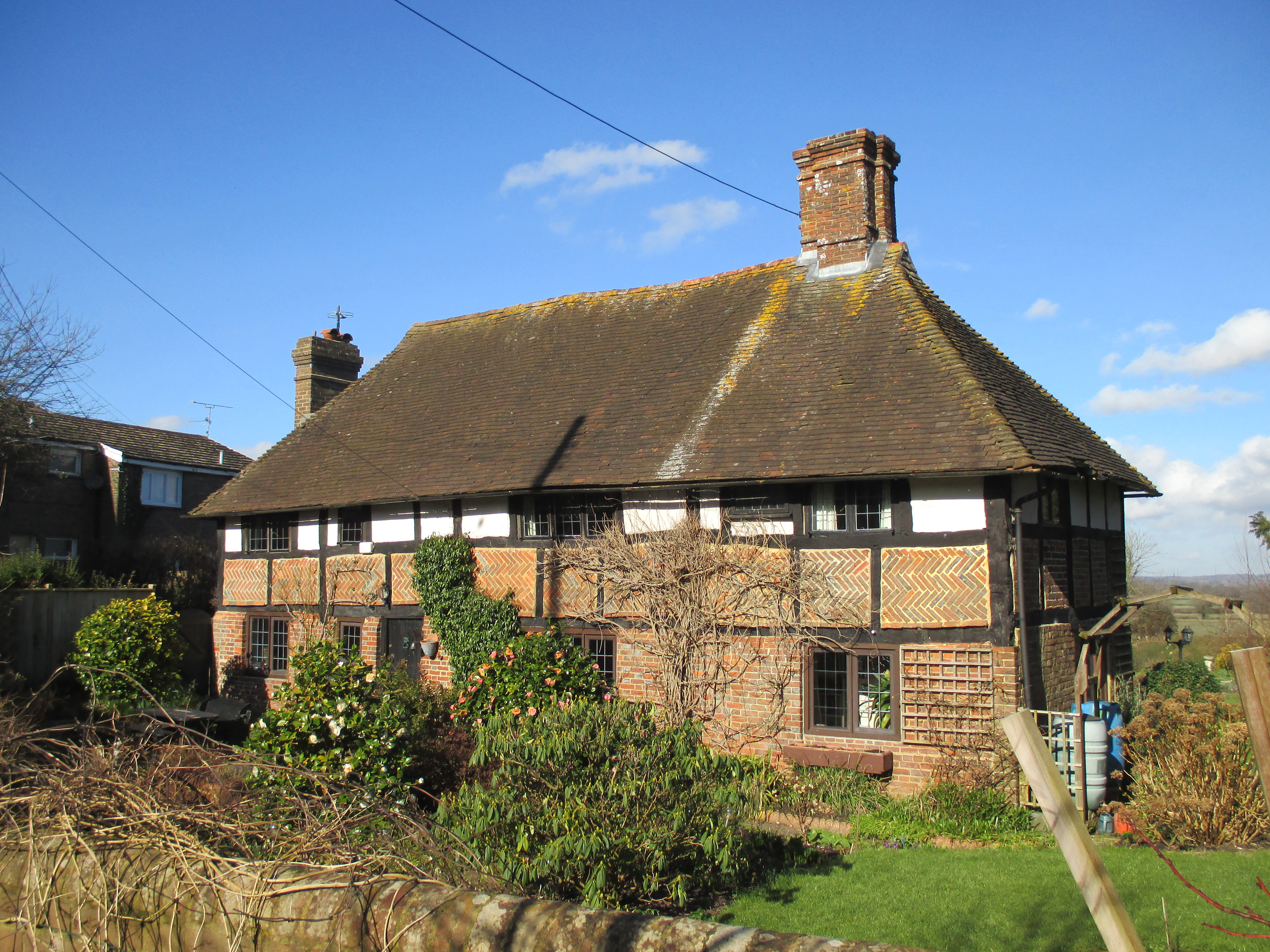
- Stockmans, 17th-century house

- Location within West Sussex
- OS grid reference: TQ240161
  - London: 40 miles (64 km) N
- Civil parish: Woodmancote
- District: Horsham
- Shire county: West Sussex
- Region: South East
- Country: England
- Sovereign state: United Kingdom
- Post town: HENFIELD
- Postcode district: BN5
- Dialling code: 01273
- Police: Sussex
- Fire: West Sussex
- Ambulance: South East Coast
- UK Parliament: Arundel and South Downs

Blackstone is a hamlet in the civil parish of Woodmancote and the Horsham district of West Sussex, England. Blackstone is significant for its listed 17th- and 18th-century houses and cottages.

== History ==
Blackstone in 1262 was one of two tithings (a group of households in an area of ten hides), the other being the now non-existent Bilborough at the west of the parish from Blackstone. The nucleated settlement was recorded as Blackstone Street in 1558 and as Blackstone 'hamlet' in 1595. By the early 1670s "at least eight families were apparently living there". Blackstone Street, at right angles to the line of Blackstone Lane that today runs north and south at opposite ends of the street, was in 1724 part of a west to east road from Henfield to Hurstpierpoint. It ran along a sandstone outcrop and had been the main road through the parish from the 15th to the 17th centuries; in 1469 named the Henfield-Hurstpierpoint road. Today's Blackstone Lane, the chief road running north to the west of High Cross in Albourne, from the east of Blackstone Street, was considered a branch road. At the time "several" buildings existed on either side of Blackstone Street, including the still existing Yeomans Hall, Stockmans, and Blackstone House.

Up to the middle of the middle of the 19th century until at least the First World War, crop production at Blackstone was chiefly of wheat, oats and beans. From 1855 to at least 1878, postal clearing and delivery was through the post office at Hurstpierpoint; by 1890 this had transferred to Henfield. The only trade listed at Blackstone in 1866 was a carpenter; by 1878 there was a carpenter and beer retailer; by 1890, a farmer and beer retailer; by 1899, a shopkeeper; by 1905 and 1911, a farmer; and by 1915, a farmer at Blackstone Farm, a nurseryman, a beer retailer, and a builder. In 1911 a Church of England "Mission Room" was recorded. A 1610 map by John Speed recorded a park at Blackstone.

== Governance ==
Blackstone is administered locally by Woodmancote Parish Council. The parish is part of the Arundel and South Downs Parliamentary constituency. Prior to Brexit in 2020, it was represented by the South East England constituency for the European Parliament.

== Geography ==
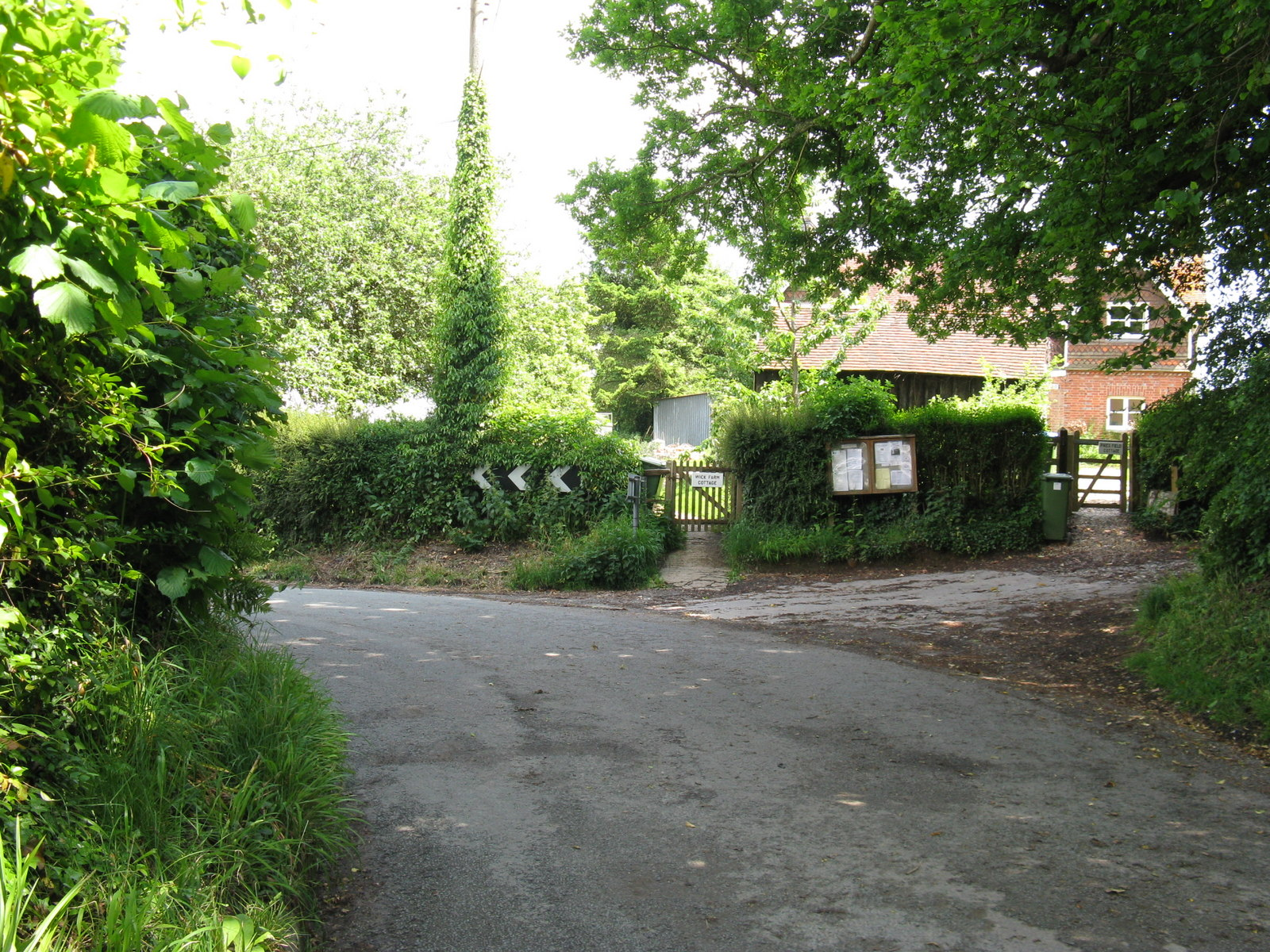
The east of Blackstone Street turning into Blackstone Lane at Wick Farm Cottage

Blackstone is 25 miles (40 km) east from the city and county town of Chichester, 10 miles (20 km) south-east from the district town of Horsham, and 1 mile (1.6 km) north from the village of Woodmancote. The settlement is centred on Blackstone Street, a right angled section of Blackstone lane that runs south to Woodmancote village and north to Henfield Road at High Cross in the parish of Albourne.

Blackstone sits on a sandstone knoll at the geographic centre of Woodmancote parish. At the extreme east of Blackstone Street, at Wick Farm Cottage, is a public bridleway which runs south for 850 yards (780 m) then west for 300 yards (270 m) to meet Blackstone Lane. From the corner at the extreme west of Blackstone Street, next to Yeomans Hall on Blackstone Grange Farm, is a road leading to a public footpath which runs for 1.3 miles (2 km) to the parish's northern boundary at Wheatsheaf Road, the B2116; half way along, the footpath crosses Cutlers Brook, a tributary of the River Adur. At 130 yards (120 m) south from the western corner of Blackstone Street an east-to-west public footpath crosses Blackstone Lane. The footpath runs 1,000 yards (900 m) west to meet Furners Lane, at the west of the parish, and then a further 1,650 yards (1,500 m) to the village of Henfield.

Within Blackstone, defined by hamlet road signs, are detached, semi-detached, and terraced houses and cottages, two farms, a stables, barns, a furniture maker and a campervan hire company. Just outside the hamlet at the north is a wastewater treatment works for Southern Water.

== Landmarks ==
There are five Grade II listed buildings in Blackstone, all at the west of Blackstone Street.

'Stockmans', on the corner at the north side of Blackstone Street, dates to possibly before the 17th century. It is of two storeys and three bays, the lower storey in red brick, the upper timber-framed with part brick and part plaster infill and a hipped roof. Also at the north of the street, further east, is 'Blackstone Farmhouse', dating to the mid-18th century, of five bays in two storeys, and of red brick with a Horsham Stone tiled roof with chimneys at each end. There is an external '1674' datestone. Today the house is named by an external plaque as 'Blackstone House'. At the east corner of the street is Yeomans Hall, possibly pre-17th century, and its attached former barn, 18th century, making a tiled roof L-shaped complex of two storeys with hipped roofs and casement windows. The hall is timber framed, with red brick infill on the north face, and includes an external chimney breast. The south side is completely red brick faced, the east with overlapping red tile facing above a brick plinth. The red brick faced 'barn' attached at right angles at the west is incorporated making a residential whole. In the early 17th century a parlour wing, service extensions, an upper floor and the external chimney stack were added to the hall. On the south side of the street, opposite Yeomans Hall, is 'Corner Cottages', an 18th-century terraced range of four two-storey cottages with a shallow hipped roof. The cottages are of red brick laid in Sussex bond, three stretchers to one header. The windows in three of the cottages are sash but sliding horizontally. On the same side of the street in the next plot is 'Old Timbers', possible dating to before the 17th century, of two storeys and three bays with casement windows. It is timber framed with white painted brick infilling below and white plaster above. the roof at the west is hipped, and at the east is truncated with an added lower lean-to. Two further terraced ranges of cottages are on the north side of the east end of Blackstone street, both dating to the mid-19th century; one is timber-framed, the other with a facade of overlapping slate tiles.
