= Woodmancote, Horsham District =

Village and parish in West Sussex, England

Coordinates: 50.91872°N 0.24441°W

Woodmancote
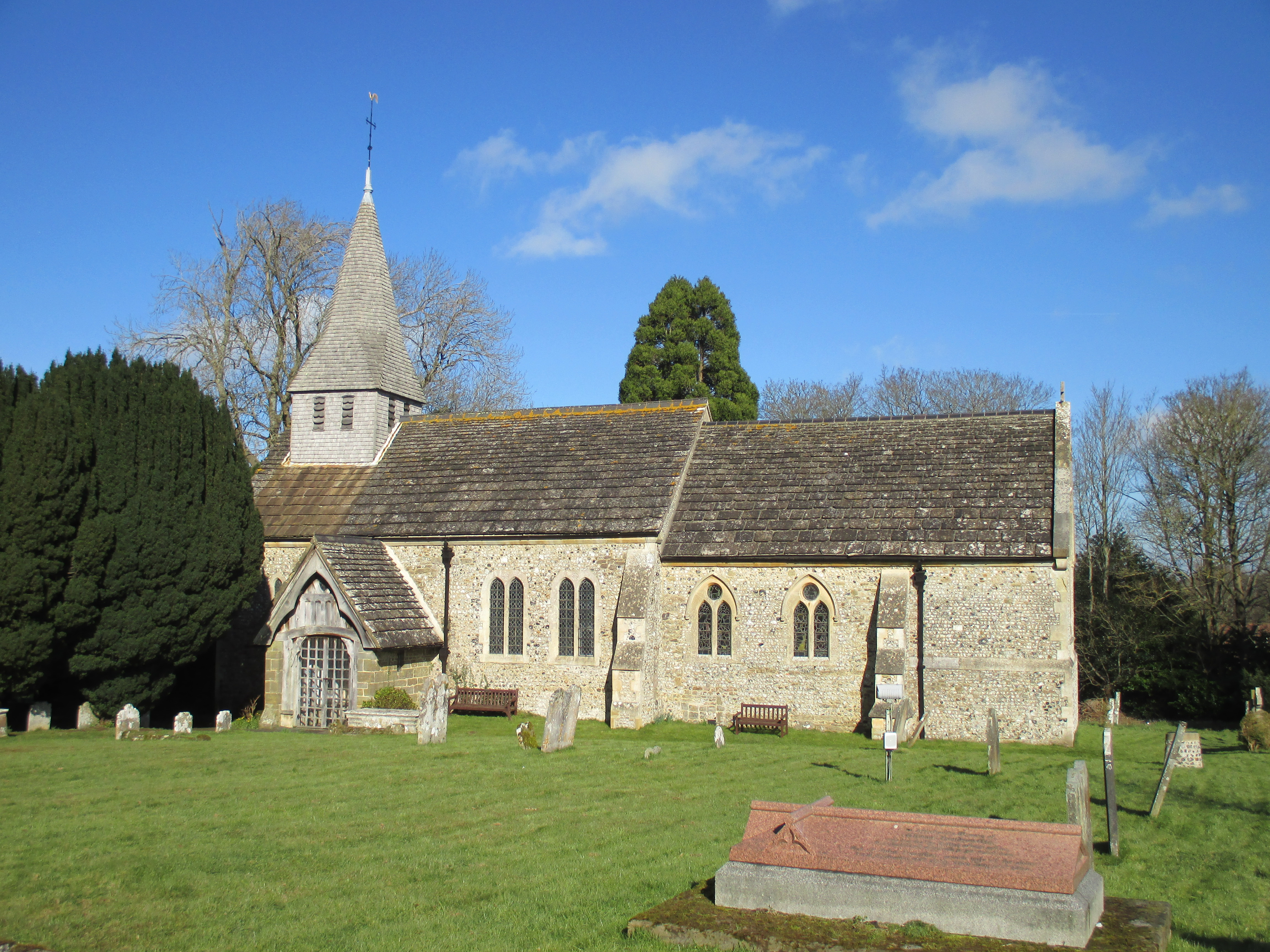
- Church of St. Peter

- Location within West Sussex
- Area: 8.49 km^{2} (3.28 sq mi)
- Population: 478 2001 Census; 543 (2011 Census)
  - Density: 56/km^{2} (150/sq mi)
- OS grid reference: TQ235147
  - London: 41 miles (66 km) N
- Civil parish: Woodmancote
- District: Horsham
- Shire county: West Sussex
- Region: South East
- Country: England
- Sovereign state: United Kingdom
- Post town: HENFIELD
- Postcode district: BN5
- Dialling code: 01273
- Police: Sussex
- Fire: West Sussex
- Ambulance: South East Coast
- UK Parliament: Arundel and South Downs

Woodmancote is a village and civil parish in the Horsham District of West Sussex, England. The village is 1 mile (1.6 km) south-east of Henfield on the A281 road. It should not be confused with the other West Sussex village of Woodmancote near Chichester.

This scattered community has no village centre. The parish includes the hamlet of Blackstone. The Anglican parish church, St Peter's, which stands alone beside the A281 road, dates to the thirteenth century, and was largely rebuilt in 1868. Close to the church is Woodmancote Place, a large house used as a country club. There is also a parish hall.

Woodmancote is recorded in the Domesday Book of 1086 as "Odemancote". Two of the Lewes martyrs, burnt at the stake in the Marian Persecutions of 1556, Thomas Harland and John Oswald, came from Woodmancote.

The parish has a land area of 849 hectares (2,100 acres). In the 2001 census 478 people lived in 189 households, of whom 248 were economically active. At the 2011 Census the population was 543.

== Blackstone ==
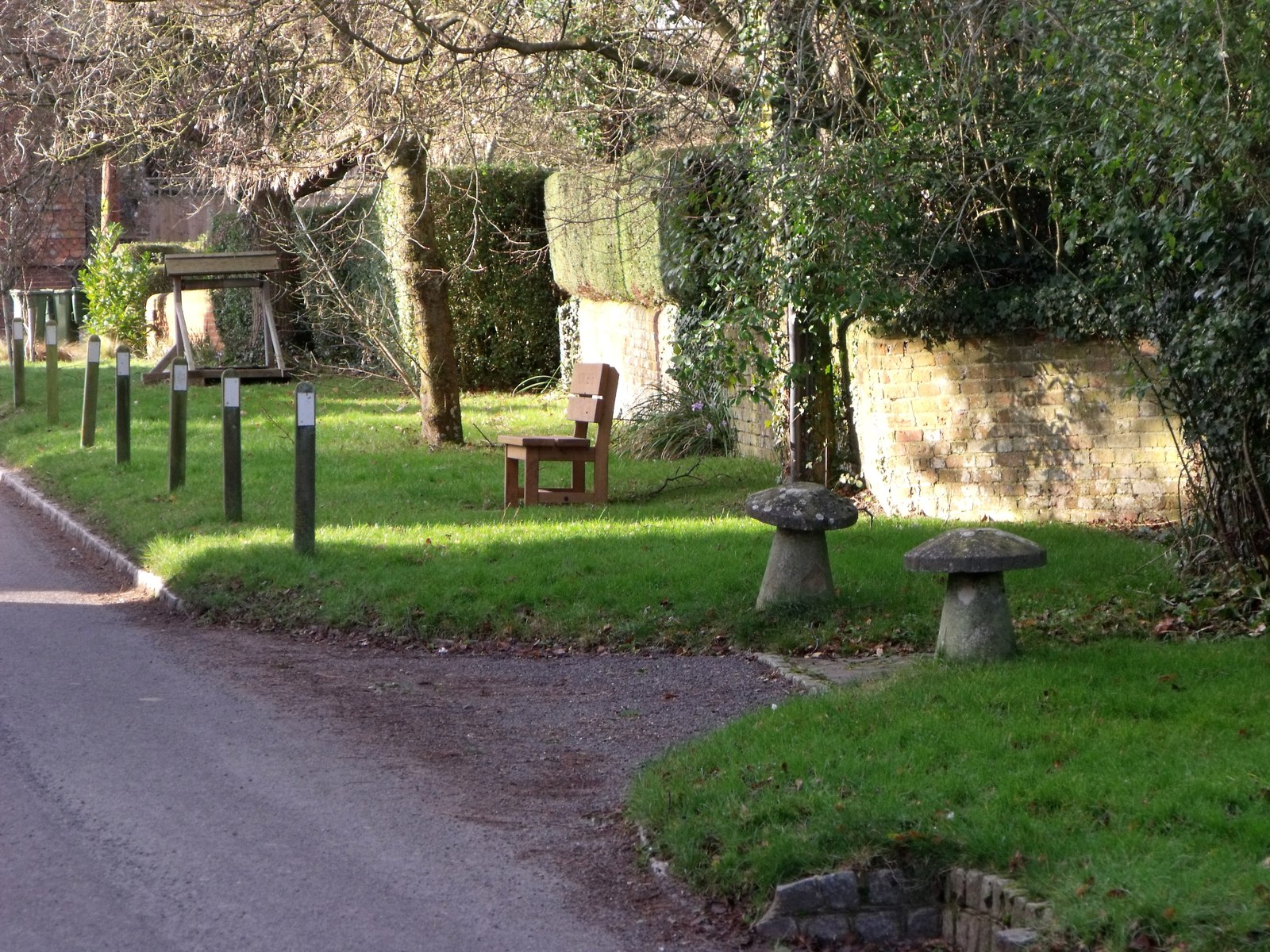
Blackstone

The hamlet of Blackstone (TQ 240 161) has many ancient houses and barns, in a still largely farmed landscape. To its north, Blackstone Lane widens to a linear green for much of its length to Blackstone Gate. There was a little triangular common at the Gate that was enclosed around 150 years ago.^{:172}

== Notable buildings and areas ==
Notable areas in Woodmancote

In early medieval times this was a lonely countryside of commons, marshes and woods. The Saxons commonly noted thorn bushes as boundary marks between estates and many of the boundary mark names survive here such as Eaton Thom (TQ 238 181) (a half-timbered 'gingerbread' house), which may be a corruption of'Heathen Thorn'), Wodesmansthorne (the old alternative name for Woodmancote) and Paythorne (Paga's thorn). It is now largely farmland with three notable woods and some big houses.^{:172}

=== Woodmancote church ===
Woodmancote church (TQ 231 149) is dedicated to St. Peter. It was originally built in the 13th century. In about 1228 the church was given to the Knights Templar, and in 1312 it passed to the Knights of St John. It was largely rebuilt in 1869 and very little remains from the earlier periods of the church history. The bowl, drum and pillars of the font are Norman and the remainder dates back to the 14th century. It has some fossil winklestone in its south wall.

=== Woodmancote Place ===
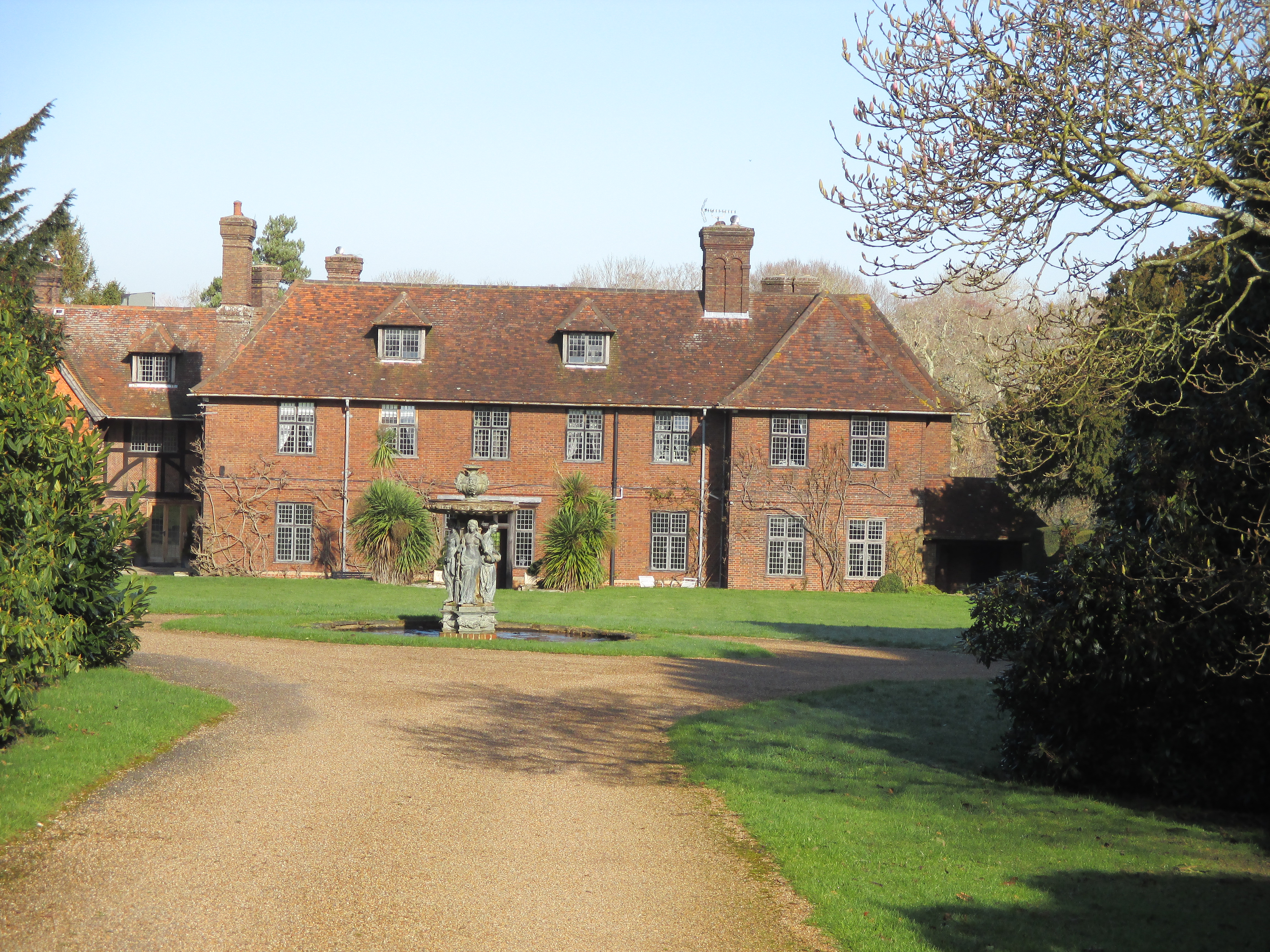
Woodmancote Place

Woodmancote Place (TQ 231 151) sits next to the church and its surrounding outbuildings, are of many periods, right back to Chaucerian times. It was owned by Countess Guda at the times of the Domesday Book and then the notorious Sir Edward Seymour, otherwise known as Edward the Protector.

=== Bylsborough ===
Just north of Furners's Lane is Bylsborough (TQ 229 162). It was once a hamlet, but is now reduced to a big house, outbuildings and an old cottage. It is a Grade II listed building. In front of the house is a giant sweet chestnut pollard.

=== Streams ===
There are two notable streams in the parish. The Cutler's Brook runs through the parish to its north. It is a tributary of the River Adur that rises near Clayton. It then runs through Hurstpierpoint, south of Albourne and north of Woodhouse Wood, north of Henfield and joins the Adur at Betley Bridge.

The Pokerlee Stream runs through the south of parish. It then runs into Henfield and into the Beeding Brooks where it joins the River Adur. It runs through an area called the Moors (TQ 225 155), which is a low plain with some unimproved wet rush pastures. There is gorse and birch in the fence lines and bog pondweed in two ditches. To the north of the Moors is a pony-grazed western fields behind the Swains Farm Shop hold a large and well-managed population of the rare meadow thistle in Sussex, with a fine display of heath spotted orchid, lousewort, tormentil, ragged robin, marsh pennywort and at least six sedges.

=== Woodhouse Wood ===
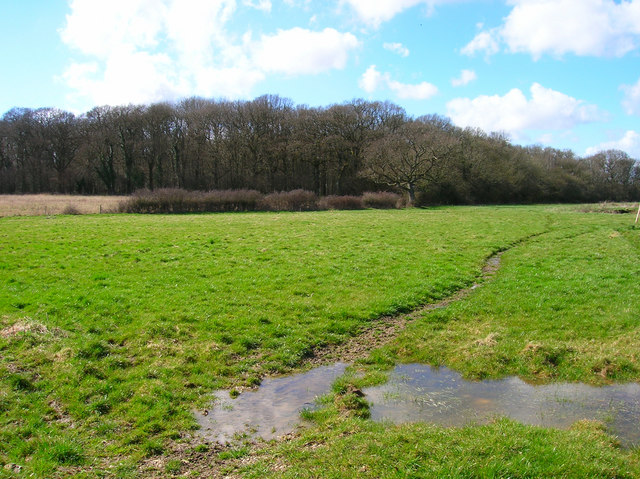
Woodhouse Wood

Woodhouse Wood (TQ 237 170) is a remote and quiet wood west of Blackstone Bridge. It is carpeted with bluebells and has stand of oak maidens. It benefits from Cutler's Brook and in spring is busy with bumblebees, beetles, nibbling caterpillars and banded demoiselles flying in from the water. There is the impressive cotton wool gall, Andricus quercus ramuli, on the oaks there, accompanied by the metallic green gall wasps which are scarcely 2 mm long.^{:172}

=== The Alders ===
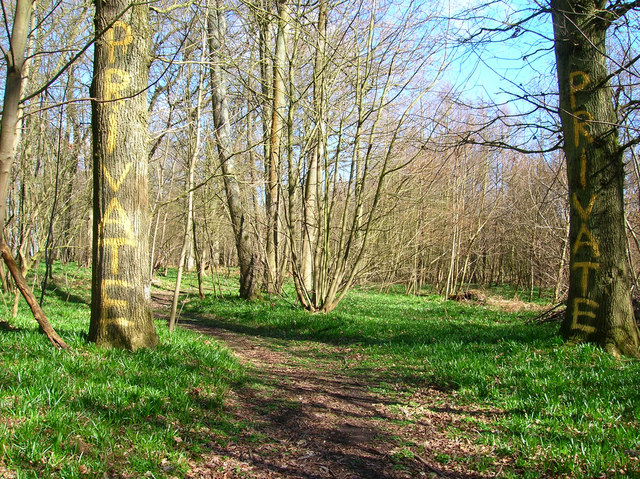
The Alders

The Alders woods (TQ 229 154), known locally as the "Bluebell Wood", are mostly wet carr, but are carpeted by Bluebells on the northern rising ground. On the east side of The Alders was a small marsh (TQ 230 154) with heath spotted orchid, marsh cinquefoil, narrow buckler-fern and water purslane. More recently it has become overgrown with bramble and young saplings and the Rampion Wind Farm cable runs along its eastern edge.^{:173}

=== West Wood ===
West Wood (TQ 242 149) is an ancient woodland. Its coppice is largely unmanaged and many of its Oaks are thin poles. It had had butterfly orchid, along with classic clay woods plants like wood millet and midland hawthorn.:^{172}
