= Sandy Campbell (British Army officer) =

Recipient of the George Cross

Alexander Fraser Campbell
- Born: 2 May 1898; Dalmellington, Ayrshire, Scotland
- Died: 18 October 1940 (aged 42); Whitley Common, Coventry, England
- Burial place: London Road Cemetery, Coventry
- Military career
- Allegiance: United Kingdom
- Branch: British Army
- Service years: 1940
- Rank: Second Lieutenant
- Nickname: Sandy
- Service number: 135004
- Unit: Royal Engineers
- Conflicts: First World War; Second World War: Home Front; The Blitz †
- Awards: George Cross

Alexander Fraser Campbell, GC (2 May 1898 – 18 October 1940), known as Sandy Campbell, was a British Army officer of the Royal Engineers who was posthumously awarded the George Cross for conspicuous gallantry in defusing a bomb in October 1940.

== Triumph Engineering Works unexploded bomb ==
On 14 October 1940 at Chapel Street, Coventry, Second Lieutenant Campbell along with Sergeant Michael Gibson and Sappers W. Gibson, R. Gilchrest, A. Plumb, R.W. Skelton and Driver E.F.G. Taylor were tasked to deal with a 250-kilogram (550 lb) unexploded bomb.

The sappers spent almost four days uncovering the bomb which was found to contain a very damaged delayed-action fuse mechanism which could not be removed in situ. Though any electrical charge within the fuse was thought to have dissipated, Campbell still applied a discharge tool.

On 17 October 1940, Campbell, believing the bomb to be inert, ordered it to be moved. It was loaded onto a lorry and taken to Whitley Common where it could be detonated safely. Campbell positioned himself next to the bomb on this journey listening for any timer mechanism that might have been activated by the bomb's removal. The bomb was remotely detonated.

== Death ==
On 18 October 1940, Campbell and his squad were attempting to complete an identical procedure on another bomb. However, after arriving at Whitley Common, the bomb exploded during unloading, killing the entire bomb squad.

Following a funeral service at Coventry Cathedral on 25 October 1940, the squad were buried in a collective grave in Coventry's London Road Cemetery. The squad comprised 2nd Lt. Alexander Fraser Campbell, Sergeant Michael Gibson, Sappers William Gibson, Richard Gilchrest, Jack Plumb, Ronald William Skelton and Driver E. F. Taylor.

== George Cross citation ==
Campbell's posthumous George Cross citation appeared in The London Gazette on 22 January 1941:

For most conspicuous gallantry in carrying out hazardous work in a very brave manner, to 2nd Lieutenant A. F. Campbell, R.E. (since deceased). Second Lieutenant Campbell was called upon to deal with an unexploded bomb in the Triumph Engineering Company's works in Coventry. This bomb had halted war production in two factories involving over 1,000 workers and evacuation of local residents. He found it to be fitted with a delayed action fuse which was impossible to remove. He decided to remove the bomb to a safe place. This was done by lorry with Second Lieutenant Campbell lying alongside the bomb to enable him to hear if it started ticking so he could warn the driver to escape. Having got it to a safe place he successfully disposed of it. Unfortunately, he was killed the next day whilst dealing with another unexploded bomb.

His George Cross is on display in the Royal Engineers Museum.

== Memorial ==
On 18 October 2006, the anniversary of the death of Campbell and his fellow soldiers, a memorial plaque was dedicated to their memory close to where they died on Whitley Common.

The memorial reads:

In Memory of the Seven Men of the Royal Engineers 9th Bomb Disposal Company Who Lost Their Lives When an Unexploded German Bomb Removed from the City Centre Exploded Whilst Being Unloaded Near This Spot for De-Fusing on Whitley Common on 18 October 1940:

- 2nd Lieutenant A. F. Campbell, G.C., Age 42
- Sgt. M. Gibson, G.C., Age 34
- Sapper W. Gibson, Age 22
- Sapper R. Gilchrist, Age 23
- Sapper J. Plumb, Age 25
- Sapper R. W. Skelton, Age 20
- Driver E. F. Taylor, R.A.S.C., Age 32
