= James Starley =

English industrialist and inventor (1830-1881

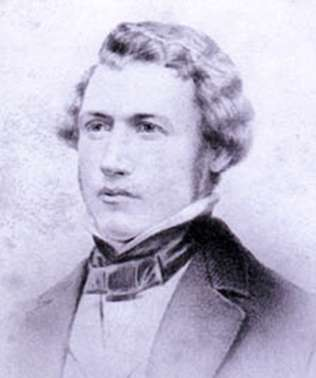
- James Starley
- Born: 21 April 1830; Albourne, Sussex, England
- Died: 17 June 1881 (aged 51); Coventry, Warwickshire, England
- Burial place: London Road Cemetery, Coventry, Warwickshire, England
- Occupation: Inventor
- Known for: Development of the bicycle

James Starley (21 April 1830 – 17 June 1881) was an English inventor and father of the bicycle industry. He was one of the most innovative and successful builders of bicycles and tricycles. His inventions include the differential gear, the perfection of the bicycle chain drive, and the penny-farthing.

== Childhood ==
Starley was born in 1830 at Albourne, West Sussex, the son of Daniel Starley, a farmer, and his wife Ann Stenning. He began working on the farm at nine, showing early talent as an inventor by making a rat trap from an umbrella rip and a branch of a willow tree. He ran away from home as a teenager and went to Lewisham, in south London. There he worked as an under-gardener, in his spare time mending watches and creating devices such as a mechanism to allow a duck to get through a hole in a fence, closing a door behind it if a rat tried to follow.

== Adult life ==
Starley's employer, John Penn, bought a rare and expensive sewing machine. Starley mended it when it broke down and improved the mechanism. Penn knew Josiah Turner, a partner of Newton, Wilson and Company, the makers of the machine, and in 1859 Starley joined its factory in Holborn. Turner and Starley started their own Coventry Sewing Machine Company in Coventry around 1861. Turner's nephew brought a new French bone-shaker to the factory in 1868. The company started making bicycles and Coventry soon became the centre of the British bicycle industry.

Velocipedes (cycles) had wheels of increasingly disparate size, with the front growing ever larger than the rear. Notable were the high-wheelers, or penny-farthings, a version of which Starley made with William Hillman. Their Ariel vehicle was all-metal and had wire-spoked wheels, much lighter than wooden-spoke ones.

In 1874 Starley took out a patent which was both for the first ladies bicycle and for tangent spokes (hitherto they had all been radial, screwed into the hub). The ladies bicycle was similar to a cranked ordinary bicycle but the riding position was analogous to side-saddle on a horse: both legs (and the cranks) were on the left side of the big wheel as it went forwards. The small wheel was mounted parallel to the big wheel further to the left so that the rider was between their tracks. Starley's son William, who made the prototype (and was an experienced rider on an ordinary), found it hard to balance on it and suggested adding a third small wheel. Starley did this, resulting in the "Coventry" lever tricycle.

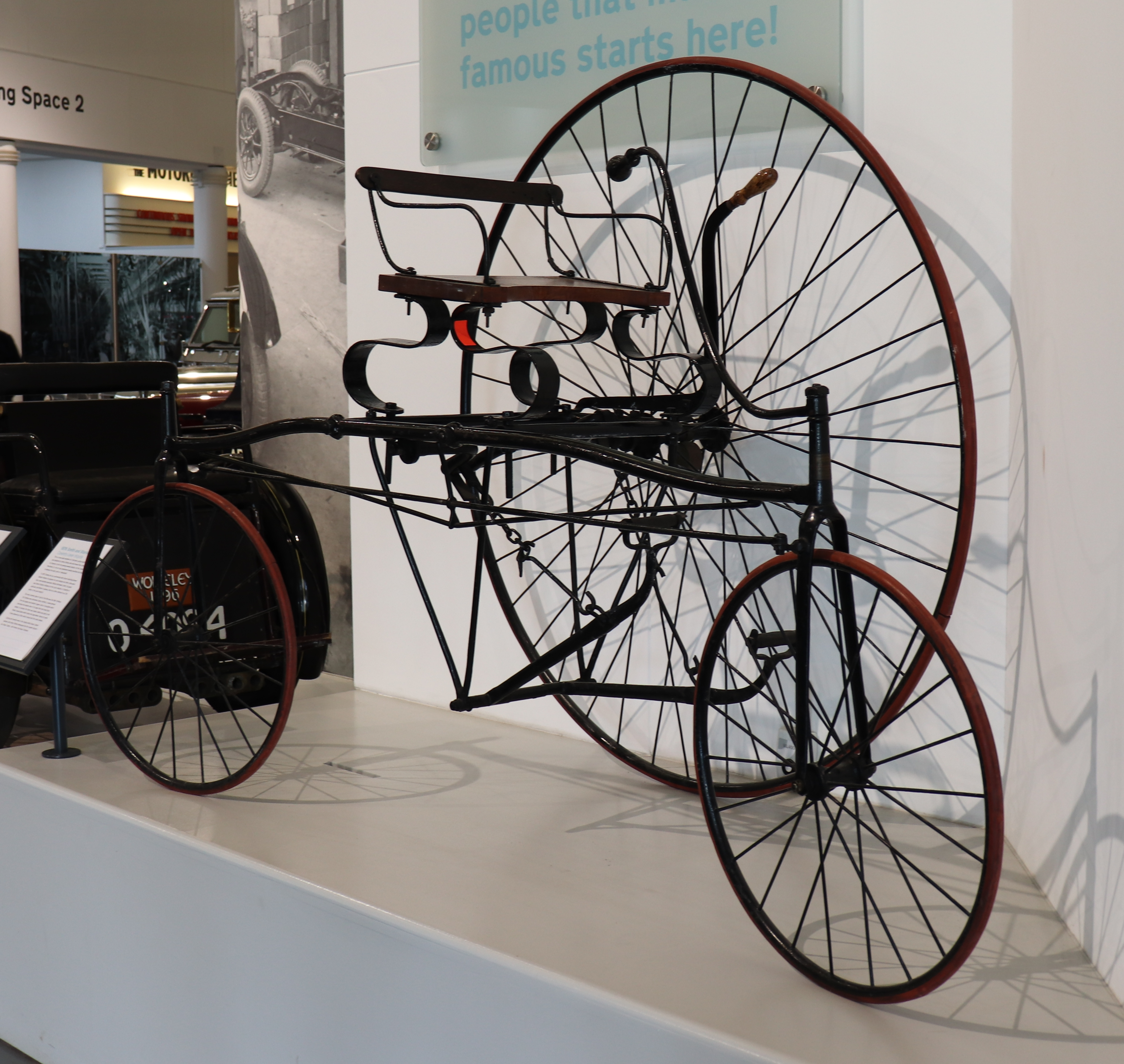
1876 Coventry Lever Tricycle

Starley patented his "Coventry" lever tricycle in 1876. It had one large wheel to the left of the seat (not a saddle) and two small wheels to its right, one at the front and one at the back. The rider operated treadles which turned the large left wheel by levers. Steering was by a handle to the rider's right, as in a bath chair; this turned both small wheels in opposite directions. It was the first cycle which was designed for use by ladies and others who could not mount an ordinary bicycle.

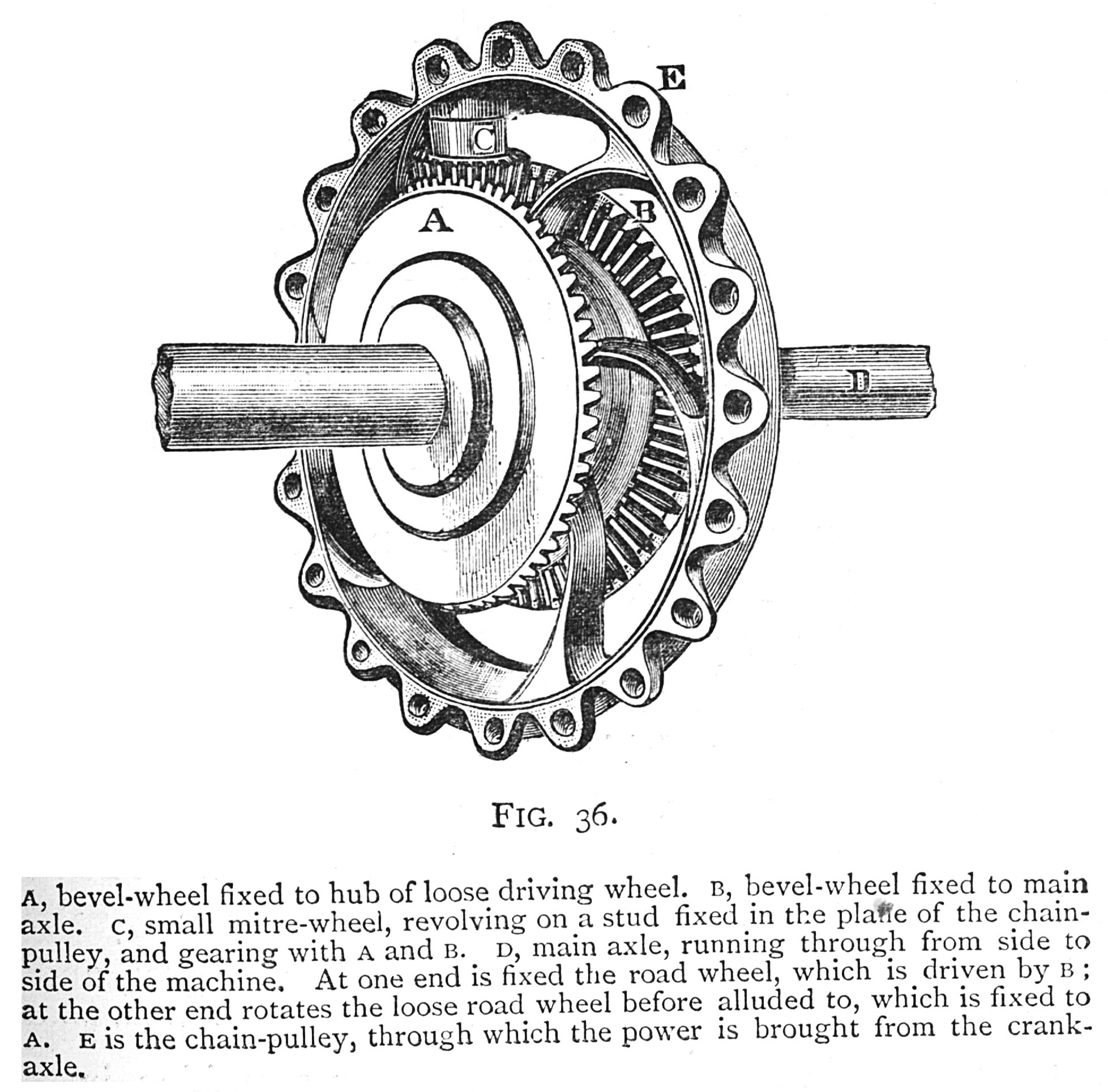
Differential patented by James Starley in 1877 and used on tricycles and quadricycles

Starley and his son William later added a second large wheel and seat in mirror image of the first. This created a quadricycle for two with the wheels in diamond formation: two small wheels on the centre-line at front and back and two large wheels in the middle. Each of the large wheels was powered independently by the rider in the adjacent seat. Starley weighed about 18 stone; his son 10. When they went up a hill, the lesser weight on the wheel on the right, being driven by William, tended to push the front, steered wheel to the left. Realising the solution, Starley cried "I have it". On the following Monday he went to London to patent his differential gear.

Starley later incorporated his differential into regular tricycles and a convertible Coventry Rotary Sociable. This was a Coventry Rotary tricycle (a pedal-and-chain version of the Coventry lever tricycle) which could be converted into a Sociable for two by adding an extra wheel etc, as in his vehicle with William.

== Personal life ==
Starley married Jane Todd when he was in his early 20s. Their son, William Starley, and his nephew, John Kemp Starley, also entered the industry and one of the outcomes was the Rover car company.

== Death ==
Starley died on 17 June 1881 in Coventry. He was buried at London Road Cemetery.

== Legacy ==
Starley's sons continued manufacturing cycles after his death in 1881 but his nephew John Kemp Starley made more of a mark. It was John Kemp Starley and Sutton who devised the recognisably modern Rover safety bicycle with 26-inch wheels (still a standard size), chain drive, and a diamond-shaped frame (no seat-tube as yet) in 1884, showing it in 1885. The penny-farthing or ordinary cycle was not safe, with a "header" accident an ever-present danger. Others had experimented with chain-driven "safety cycles" but the Rover made its mark to the extent that "Rover" (spelled with a W rather than a V) means "bike" in countries such as Poland.

In due course, motor-driven bicycles became motor-cycles and were followed by motor cars. John Kemp Starley experimented with an electric tri-car around 1888 but the petrol-driven Rover 8hp car was sold in 1904, two years after his death.

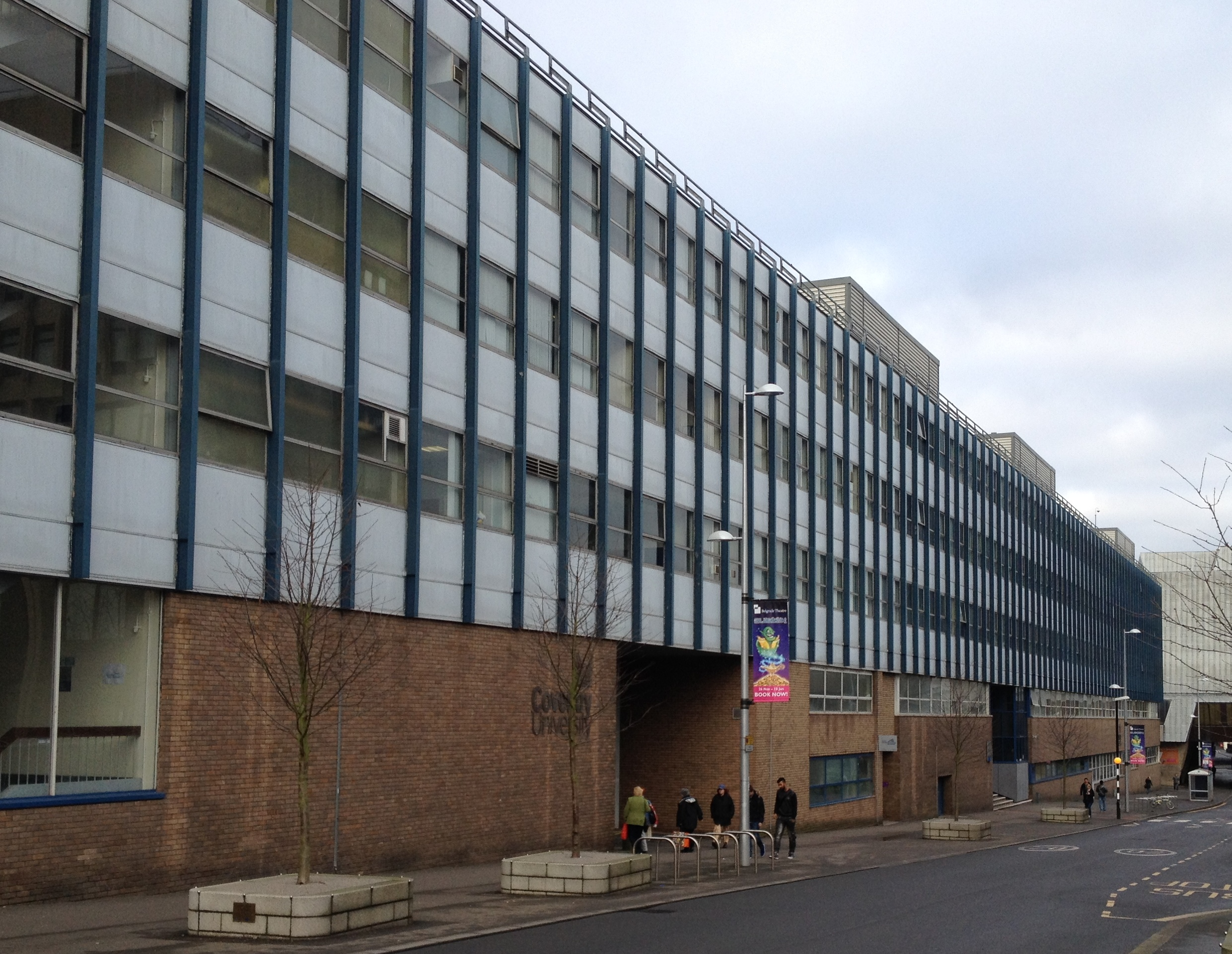
Coventry University's former James Starley building, seen in 2015

Coventry University named a 1950s building after Starley; as of December 2019, it was undergoing demolition as part of a redevelopment program. What was originally D Block of Coventry Polytechnic was renamed after Starley by Coventry University. Once it was demolished it was replaced by Starley Garden.
