= Coventry Zoo =

Zoo in Whitley, Coventry, England

Coordinates: 52.389407°N 1.490185°W

Coventry Zoo was a zoo located in Whitley, Coventry, England. Its owners and directors were members of the famous Chipperfield circus family.

The seven and a half acre site was opened to the public in 1966, attracting over 8,000 visitors on the peak day of its first week. However the success did not last long as within a decade local papers were reporting on the "shabbiness, lack of amenities and the conditions in which the animals were kept". Adding to the problems keeper Richard McCormack was charged by a two tonne hippopotamus named Harry and suffered cracked ribs, broken collarbones, a crushed liver and bite marks. Also a leopard called Zac escaped in 1972, although he was later recaptured without injuring anyone. A dolphinarium housed in a geodesic dome was in operation between 1972 and 1975, housing two animals, Chipper and Nero. In 1975 the pair were re-housed at Tierpark Hagenbeck in Hamburg, Germany. The zoo closed in 1980 and the site was sold off and developed as a sports club (currently David Lloyd Leisure) in 1983.

A memorable feature of the zoo was the 35 foot (10.6 metre) tall fibreglass Zulu which stood over the entrance. After the park closed the figure was considered lost until 2011 when its head was found being kept in a local resident's garden. In 2023, the head and spear – all that remains of the statue – were bought by local antique shop owner Tony Pedley, who intends to display them publicly within his shop.
