= Mary Eaves =

English midwife

Mary Ann Eaves (c. 1805/6 – 1875) was an English midwife. She is known for the register she kept of the 5029 births she attended throughout her 28-year career, which constitutes a primary source for the study of nineteenth-century midwifery.

== Early life ==
Mary was born Mary Willis in Coventry. On 16 July 1825, she married a silk weaver, Charles Eaves. Silk weaving was a common cottage industry in Coventry at the time, and Mary's occupation is also listed as a silk weaver on later censuses. Mary and Charles had eight children before 1851. Despite keeping a register, she seems not to have been able to write herself.

In 1841, the family was living at Spon End, Radford, Coventry, next door to a midwife called Elizabeth Roberts.

== Midwifery career ==
By 1849, Mary had been "sworn" as a midwife, although the nature of her swearing is uncertain, whether it was linked to an ecclesiastical, charitable, or guild-type organisation.

In 1850, Mary attended 83 births; the next year, her caseload almost tripled, which may be linked to the death of her neighbour Elizabeth Roberts that year. From then on, she regularly attended more than 200 births a year, with a peak of 286 in 1857, equating to more than five a week, and there are some instances of her attending four or more births in a single day. The majority of her cases were within half a mile of her home in Spon End.

She operated on behalf of the Poor Law Union and Coventry's two lying-in charities, and attended births in the workhouse. There is only one record of a medical man being summoned to assist.

Mary's practice continued until 1875, fluctuating in line with demand for Coventry silk (when demand was low, her neighbours could not afford to employ her). She continued her work as a silk weaver alongside her midwifery practice. She attended her last birth eight weeks before her death on 11 December 1875.

Badger considers that the registers demonstrate Mary to be "a sworn, competent woman who had the confidence of those on whom she relied for her income," and work against "stereotypes of ignorant, untrained nineteenth-century midwives".

Mary was buried at London Road Cemetery in Coventry.
