= Albourne =

Village and civil parish in West Sussex, England

Coordinates: 50.93509°N 0.20191°W

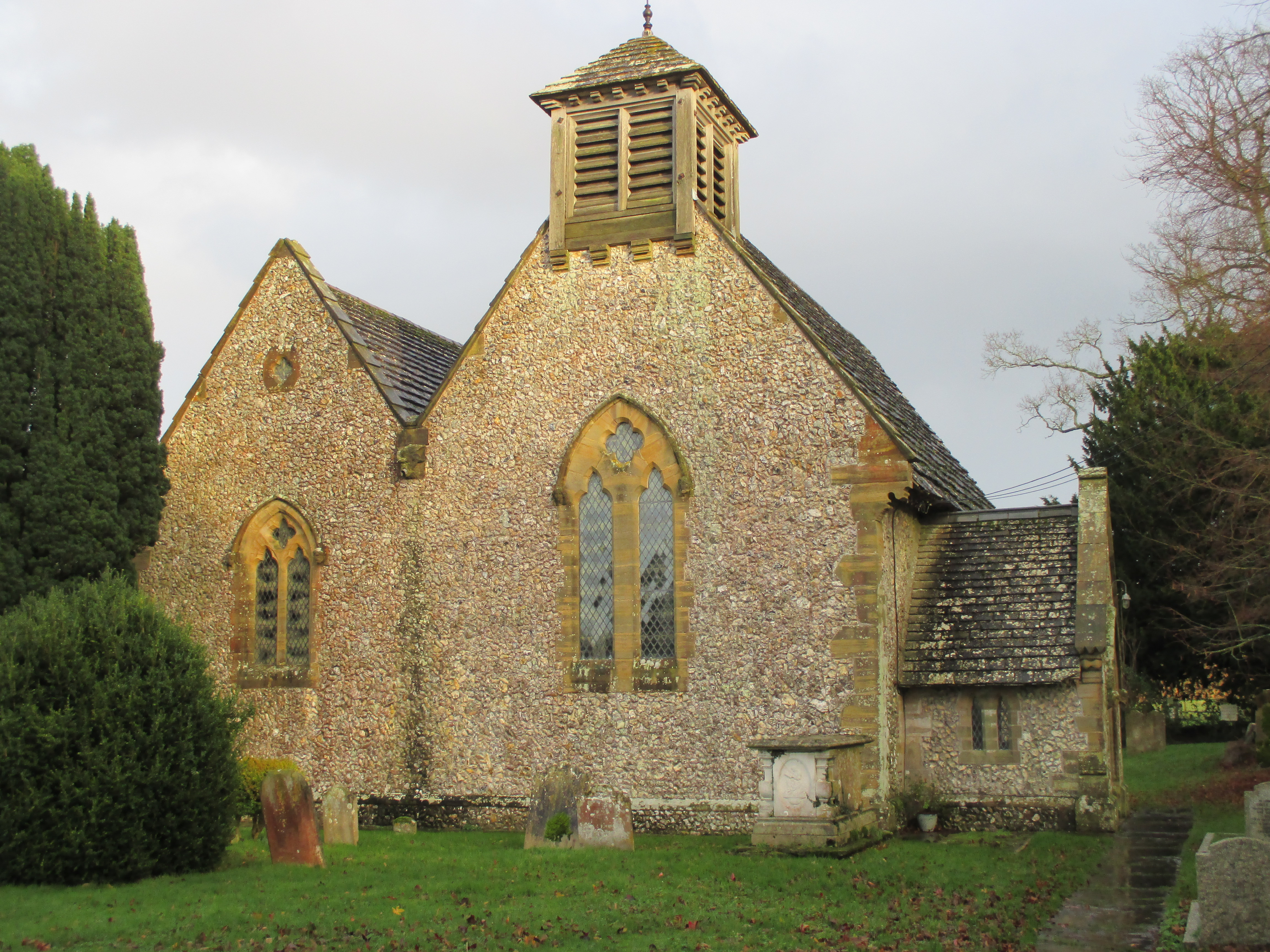
- Church of St. Bartholomew

- Location within West Sussex
- Area: 7.73 km^{2} (2.98 sq mi)
- Population: 600 2001 Census; 644 (2011 Census)
  - Density: 78/km^{2} (200/sq mi)
- OS grid reference: TQ264166
  - London: 34 miles (55 km) N
- Civil parish: Albourne
- District: Mid Sussex
- Shire county: West Sussex
- Region: South East
- Country: England
- Sovereign state: United Kingdom
- Post town: HASSOCKS
- Postcode district: BN6
- Dialling code: 01273
- Police: Sussex
- Fire: West Sussex
- Ambulance: South East Coast
- UK Parliament: Mid Sussex
- Website: Albourne Parish Council

Albourne is a village and civil parish in the Mid Sussex district of West Sussex, England. It lies just off the A23 road three miles (4.8 km) east of Henfield. The parish has a land area of 772.9 hectares (1909 acres). In the 2001 census 600 people lived in 234 households, of whom 321 were economically active. The population at the 2011 Census was 644. The name comes from an alder-lined stream, which is likely to have been the Cutler's Brook.

English inventor and father of the bicycle industry, James Starley (1830–1881), was born in Albourne.

The village has a golf course, a riding school and a country club.

During World War II a bomb fell in the village and did blast damage to the local school. The parish council appealed to raise £200 for immediate repairs to the school and £600 for future repairs. The bomb also damaged the Rectory of the Church and left it without electric lighting or a functioning bath.

== Notable buildings and areas ==
Notable areas around Albourne

The fact Albourne sits on fertile Lower Greensand, has been both a blessing and a curse. On one side it has been very productive for crops but on the other, the countryside has been rather ruined because of the intensive farming that has resulted.

The village is home to a number of old and historic buildings. Albourne Street (TQ 264 165) has a series of very fine old houses, often timber framed, at its south end, such as Gallops (an old timber building, and the oldest building in the village), and The Pound now owned by Brighton & Hove Albion footballer Garry Nelson, which was used to impound straying animals. Both buildings were built in the 17th century. In the heart of the village is Woodbine Cottage, childhood home of James Starley, the pioneer of the different gear used on early bicycles, whose success brought prosperity of Coventry.

Church Lane runs west out of Albourne and takes you down past some veteran oak trees, past the old school, over the stream to the tiny church, St. Bartholomew, (TQ 256 161) and grand rectory, which has yellow winter aconites flowers and snowdrops on the lawn in January. In the crook of the Lane, to its south (TQ 259 162) the Cutler's Brook meets two other streams. The area is a sheltered tangle of tiny fields and streams, squelchy plats, dry banks and slopes, bushes and mature oaks.

To the north and west of Church Lane the Low Wealden countryside of hedges and oaks is relatively well preserved. To the south, the 'Singing Hills Golf Course' is surrounded by intensively farmed fields.

=== The church of St. Bartholomew ===
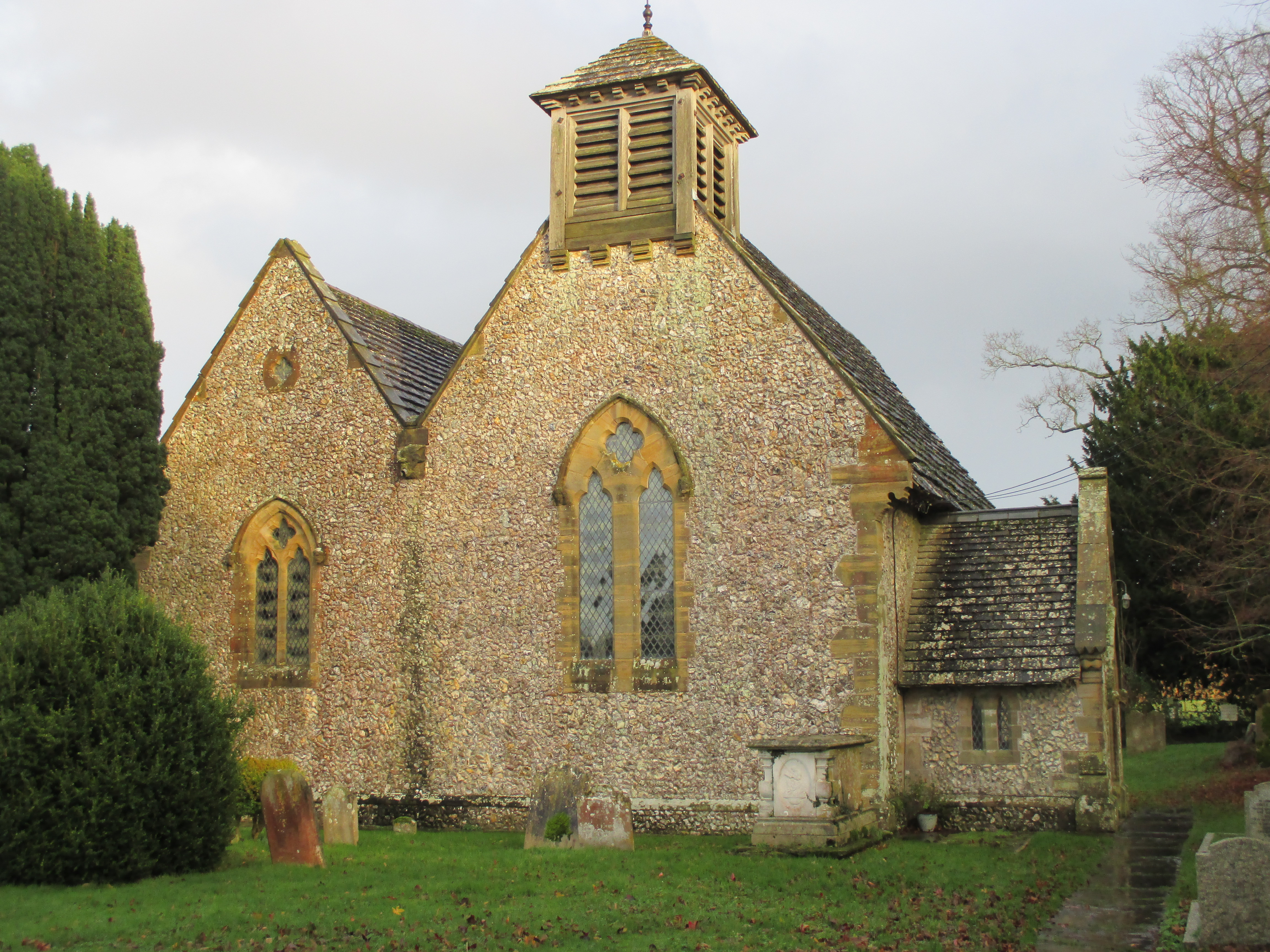
Albourne parish church

The 12th century church as largely rebuilt in 1859 with the addition of a north aisle. Parts of the chancel still date back to Saxon and Norman times. The church is situated well away from the village and the noisy A23 down a narrow lane by the park of Albourne Place.

=== Truslers Hill Lane ===
Truslers Hill Lane runs north to south on the western boundary of the parish with Woodmancote used to be lined by series of County Council smallholdings, but they were sold to private owners. In early medieval times this was a lonely countryside of commons, marshes and woods and paths needing many markers as they tracked across house-less wastes for long distances. On the brook south west of Truslers Hill Farm is a massively muscled goblinish oak (TQ245 162).

==== Albourne Place ====
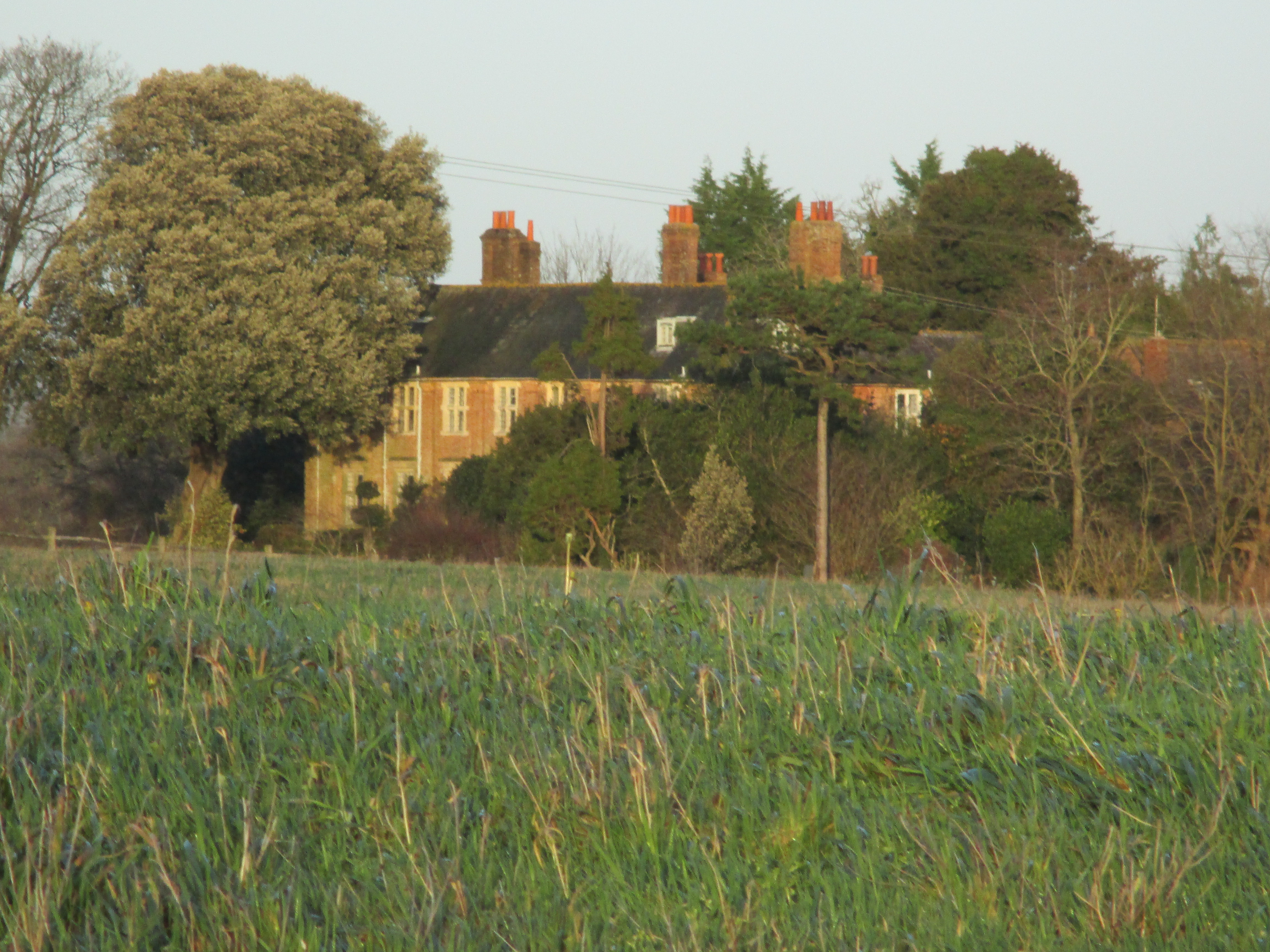
Albourne Place

Albourne Place, in Truslers Hill Lane, has been a settlement on the site since before the Domesday book. It was largely rebuilt in the mid-17th century but it was formerly a manor house. Old Threel House, a Grade II* listed building, is the original part of the 15th Century Albourne House.

It is thought that the brutal assassination of Archbishop of Canterbury Thomas Becket in 1170 could have been plotted there by Ranulph and Robert de Broc in answer to Henry II's wishes. In contrast, it is thought to have also played a part in saving the life of a later Archbishop of Canterbury, William Juxon, a supporter of Charles I, who is believed to have hidden from Cromwell's army by posing as a bricklayer at Albourne.

Albourne Place sits on 9.7-acre grounds and has a working 70 ft well which is fed by an underground stream and is one of the deepest in Sussex. It has passed through a succession of owners including Colonel Sir John Fagg, MP for Rye; Sir Eric Geddes, MP for Cambridge and Charles Goring, MP for Shoreham in the mid-19th Century.

=== Cutler's Brook ===
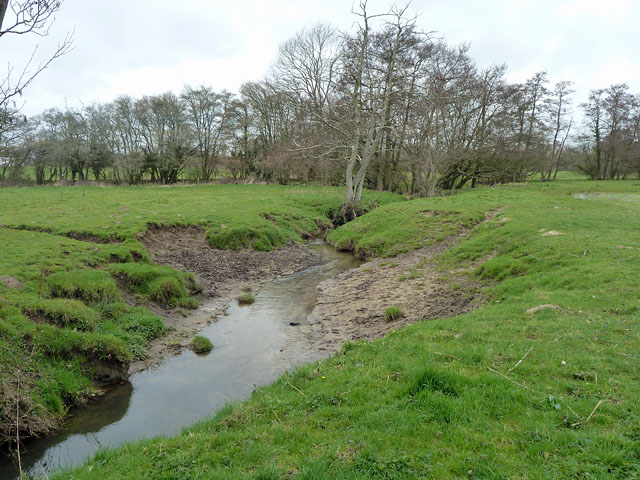
Cattle crossing, Cutlers Brook

The Cutler's Brook is a tributary of the River Adur that rises near Clayton. It passes through Hurstpierpoint, south of Albourne and north of Henfield, joining the Adur at Betley Bridge. The English public only have access to 3% of their streams, but breaking the mould the Cutler's Brook through Albourne to Hurstpierpoint, has good bank side access. It is an alder-lined stream that was originally called he 'Alor (Alder) burna (bourne)' and gave the parish its name.

=== Shaves Wood ===
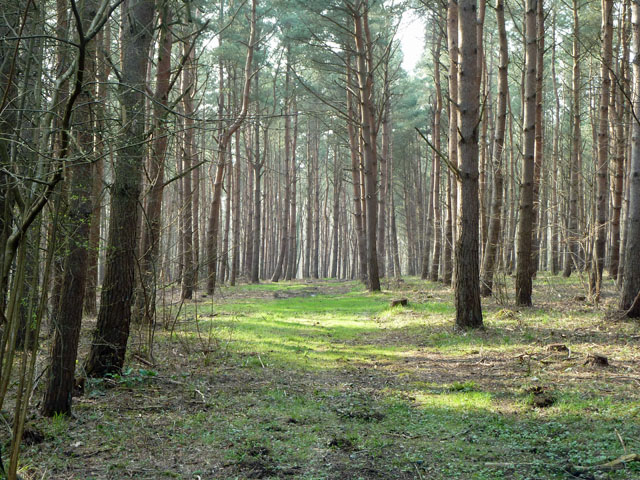
Shaves Wood

Shaves Wood (TQ 255 145) is an ancient woodland to the south of the parish on the border of the Poynings parish. Many conifer trees have been planted in place of the ancient trees that have been felled. Nevertheless, the Wood has at least 23 indicator species of an ancient woodland and the ground bora survives well in many areas.

The Roman trunk road now called the Sussex Greensand Way, links all the fertile scarp foot farmlands from Pulborough to Barcombe, and was engineered to a high its 'agger' (raised camber) are still visible in Shaves Wood.

The Wood once was home to many butterflies that are now gone. The Duke of Burgundy fritillary is gone from all the Weald, disappearing from its Shipley and Itchingfield sites in the 1970s, to be finally extirpated at Shaves Wood in 1985. The Small pearl-bordered fritillary, now being successfully reintroduced in East Sussex, was extinct in West Sussex by 1997, and was last seen in Shave's Wood in 1983. The High Brown Fritillary, which went extinct in West Sussex in 1986 and East Sussex in 1987, was lost from Shaves Wood in the early 1950s and the Marsh Fritillary, which needs damp archaic pastures with Devil's Bit, was lost earlier still in East Sussex in 1946 and West Sussex in 1975. The rough ground next to Shaves Wood was once famous for it, but the last sighting was in 1885.

=== Holmbush Wood ===
Holmbush Wood (TQ247 143) to the west of Shaves Wood has been incorrectly named on the ordnance survey maps as a plantation. It was not a plantation and has many ancient woodland plants. It retains its old coppice with standards structure of hazel under oak and ash, with a stream flowing through it. There is a population of the scarce and fairy-like Giant Lacewing there.

=== East Wood ===
To north of Holmbush Wood is East Wood (TQ 249 151) which is an old hornbeam coppice. A small 'farm' and a 'Country Club, Hotel and Spa' have been built in it.
