= Water purslane =

Water-purslane or water purslane is a common name for several plants and may refer to:

- Ludwigia palustris, native range includes North America
- Lythrum portula, native to Europe and known as "water-purslane" in the British Isles
