= Whitley, Coventry =

Suburb of southern Coventry in the West Midlands of England

Coordinates: 52.393°N 1.4936°W

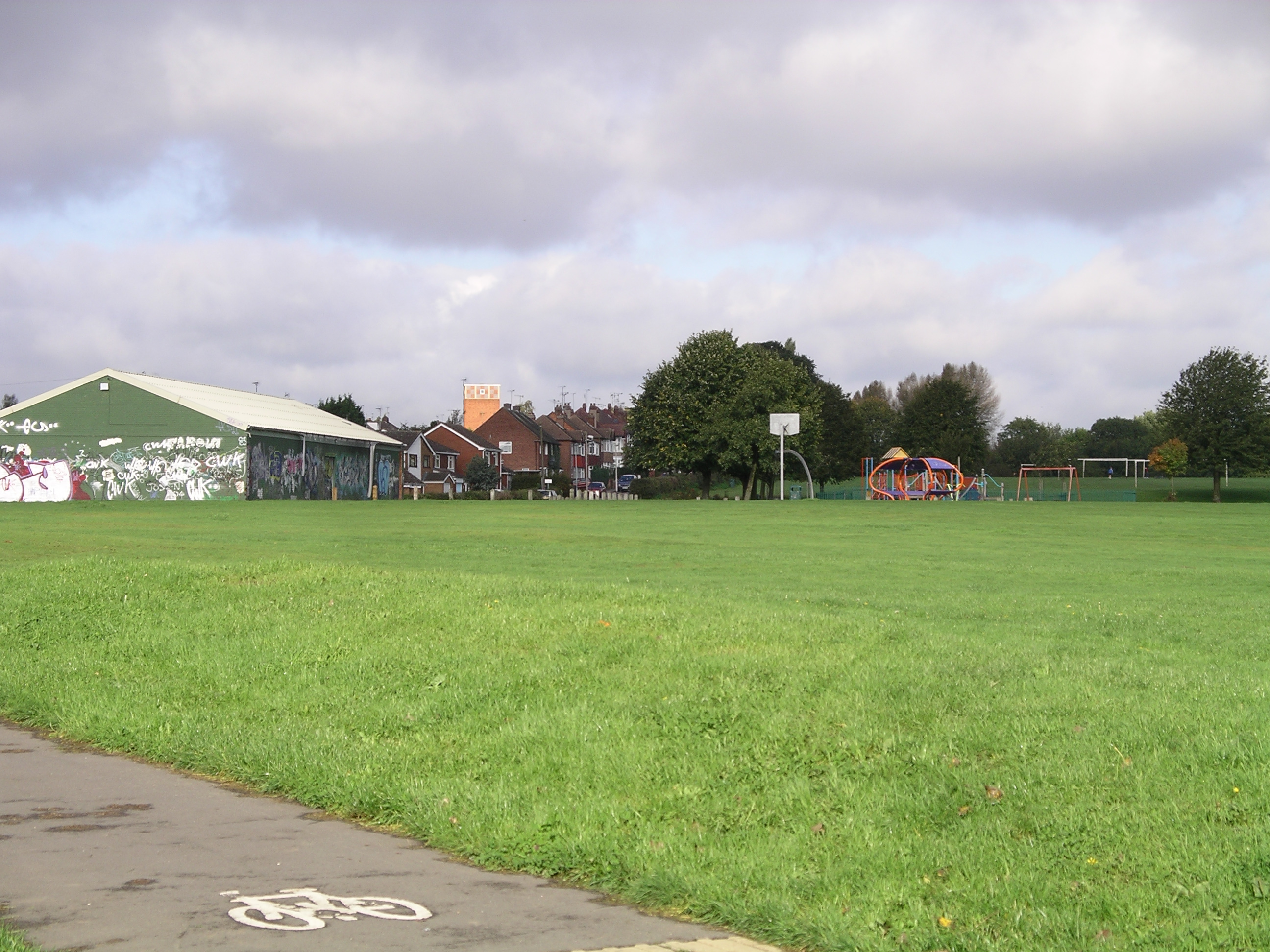
Whitley is a neighbourhood of Coventry, within Cheylsmore Ward and situated about 2.4 km south east of the city centre on London Road

Whitley is a suburb of southern Coventry in the West Midlands of England and a major centre of the English automotive corporation Jaguar Land Rover, including the headquarters of the company. The name Whitley is said to mean "from the white meadow".

== St James' Parish Church ==
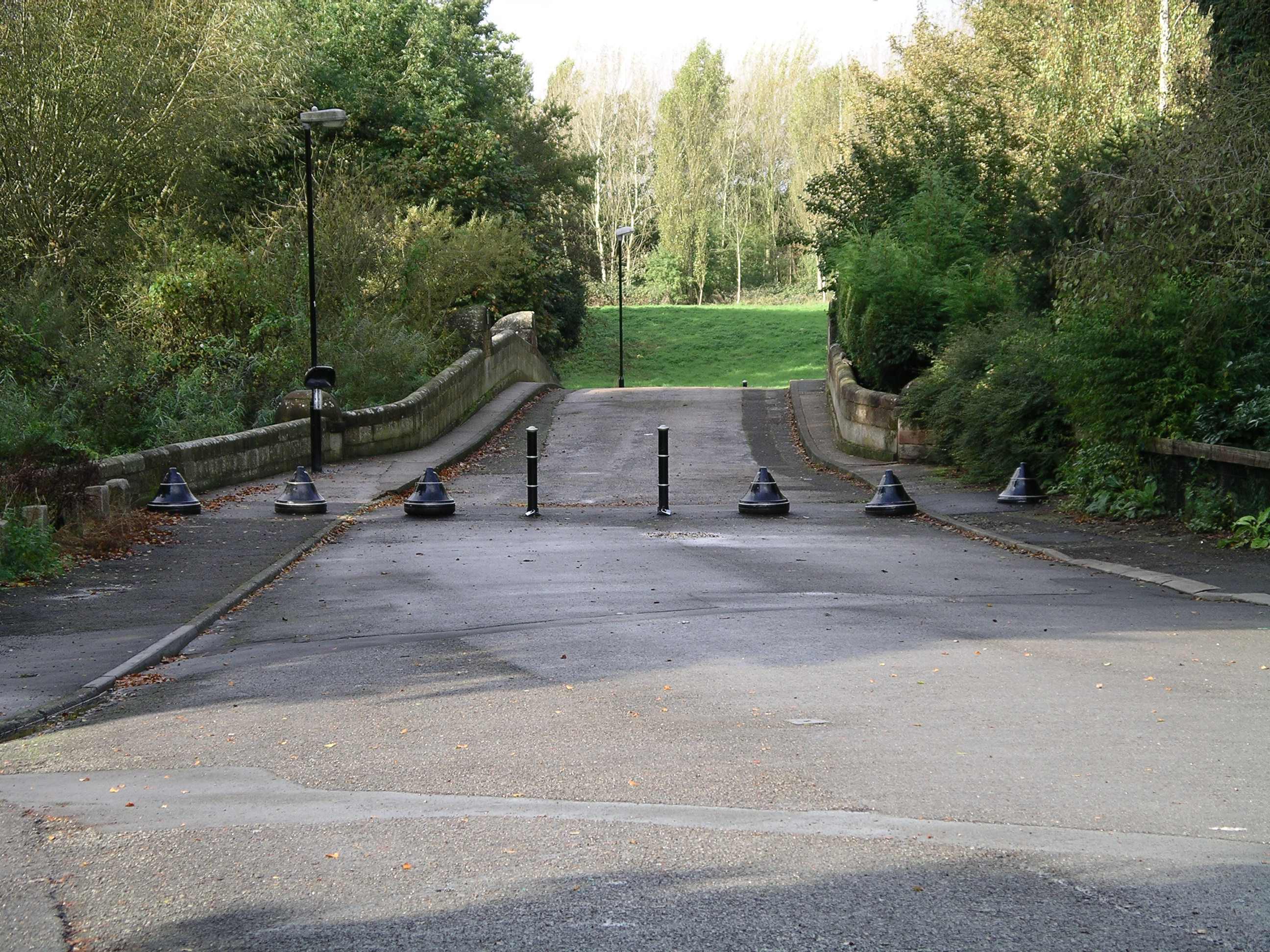
Whitley Abbey Bridge and the bollards across Abbey Road

Postcard of the bridge and mill, Whitley

From 1938 to 1951, Church of England worship had been held in the chapel in the grounds of Whitley Abbey. Prior to that, services had been held in several temporary locations. In 1951 a dual-purpose church/community hall was constructed and opened on Abbey Road. In 1967, work on a new St James' Church and vicarage was started, alongside the previous building. The new church opened in 1968, the old church becoming the church hall.

== Whitley Abbey ==
Until the turn of the 19th century, Whitley had its own identity based around a principal grand house which was built in the 14th century. Contrary to popular belief, it was this house which bore the name "Whitley Abbey" and not a monastic residence. Several changes and additions to the house took place over the following centuries until the entire estate was sold in 1924, and the house fell into disrepair. Planning permission was granted during the 1950s to build Whitley Abbey Comprehensive School on the site, which was later demolished to make way for Whitley Abbey Community School later named Whitley Business & Enterprise College, but was recently re-opened by Princess Anne and is now called Whitley Academy. It is one of the seven RSA Academies in the country, all in the West Midlands.

== Whitley Academy ==
Whitley Academy (formerly Whitley Abbey Community School) opened on 13 October 2000, replacing the former Whitley Abbey Comprehensive School built in the 1950s, which was one of the first comprehensive schools in Coventry. In July 2007, Whitley Abbey Community School gained specialist status in Business and Enterprise and was renamed Whitley Abbey Business and Enterprise College. On 1 July 2011 Whitley Abbey Business and Enterprise College became an Academy and was renamed to 'Whitley Academy'. The new academy was formally opened on 13 March 2012 by Anne, Princess Royal and is part of the RSA.

== Aircraft manufacture ==
The original factory of the Armstrong Whitworth Aircraft company was at Whitley. In the late 1930s, the buildings and associated airfield were found to be too small for modern aircraft and the operation moved to nearby Baginton Airfield, now Coventry Airport. The Armstrong Whitworth Whitley bomber aircraft was named after the plant in 1935.

== Bomb disposal on Whitley Common ==
During the Second World War, Whitley Common was used to safely dispose of unexploded bombs dropped by the German Air Force. In October 1940, British Army Officer Sandy Campbell died here while disposing of a bomb after the Coventry Blitz.

== Coventry Zoo ==
Whitley was the home to Coventry Zoo from 1966 until 1980. A David Lloyd Leisure complex, originally built in 1983, currently occupies the site.

== Gallery ==
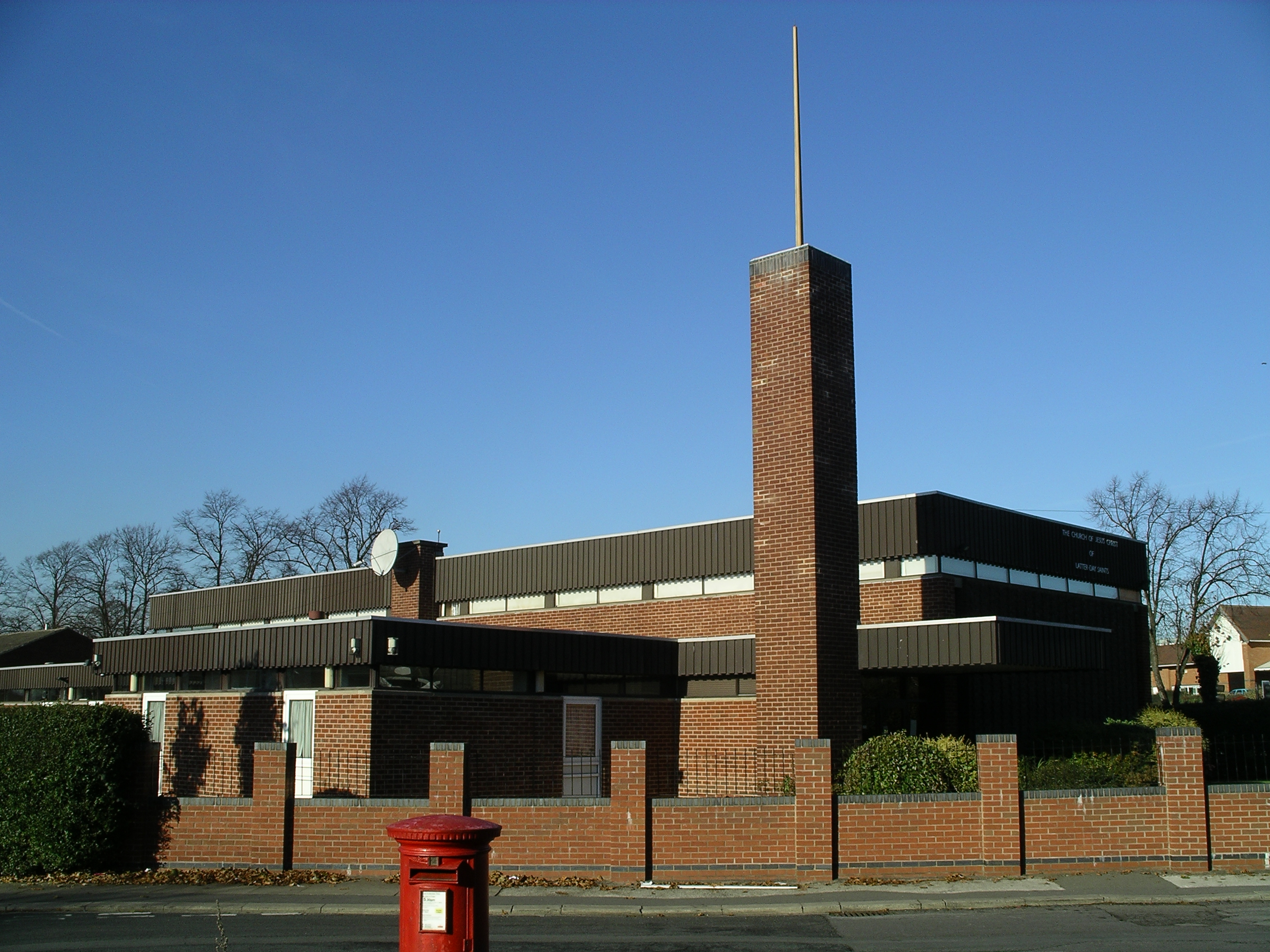
The Church of Jesus Christ of Latter-day Saints

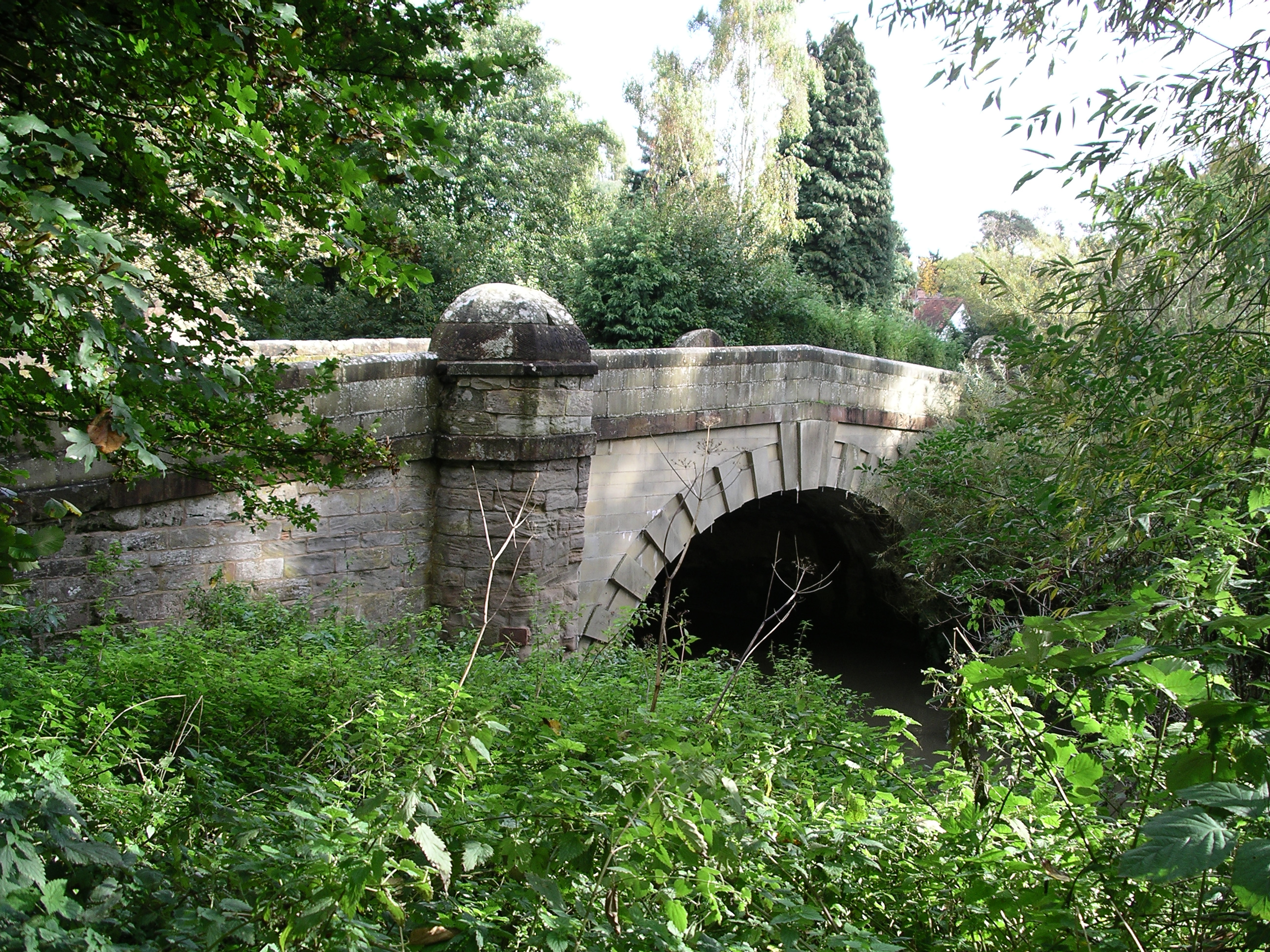
Whitley Abbey Bridge
