= London Road Cemetery =

Cemetery in Coventry, West Midlands, England

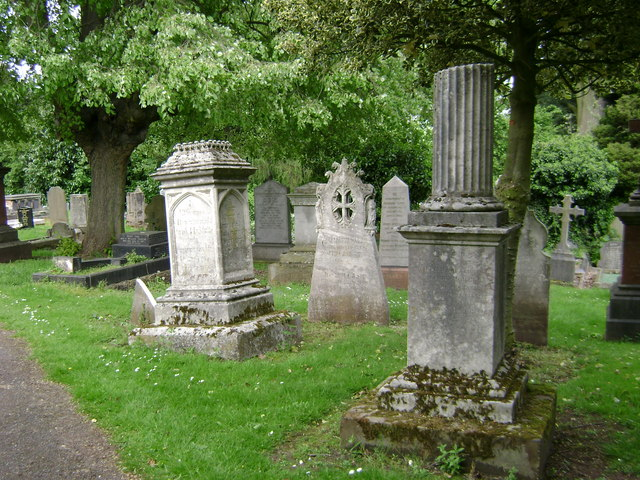
- Interactive map of London Road Cemetery

Details
- Established: 1847
- Location: Coventry
- Country: England, UK
- Coordinates: 52.3964°N 1.4982°W
- Size: 17 hectares (42 acres)
- Website: www.lrcemetery.co.uk

London Road Cemetery is a 17-hectare (42-acre) cemetery in Coventry, England, designed by Joseph Paxton and opened in 1847. It lies southeast of the city centre and is bisected by the West Coast main railway line between Coventry and Rugby, which pre-dates the cemetery and runs roughly west–east through it.

== History ==
Paxton was commissioned by the Coventry Cemetery Committee on 9 October 1845. The chosen site was a former quarry, which he first visited in early 1846. He presented his ground plan to the committee on 6 March 1846 and plans for the chapels and the landscaping on 19 March. Planting began in November that year, using a variety of native and exotic trees, including Silver Birch, weeping Silver Lime, English elm and Purple Beech. Many of these trees were supplied and planted by John Ronalds (son of Hugh Ronalds) from their nursery in Brentford.

The first superintendent, Paxton's protege Richard Ashwell, and his successors continued the programme of planting.

The cemetery is known to be one of the best preserved Victorian cemeteries in the country, despite being damaged during the Second World War following bombing of the city and the nearby Armstrong Siddeley factory.

A 'Friends of London Road Cemetery' group publishes newsletters, organises guided tours, and holds litter clean-up events.

== Buildings ==
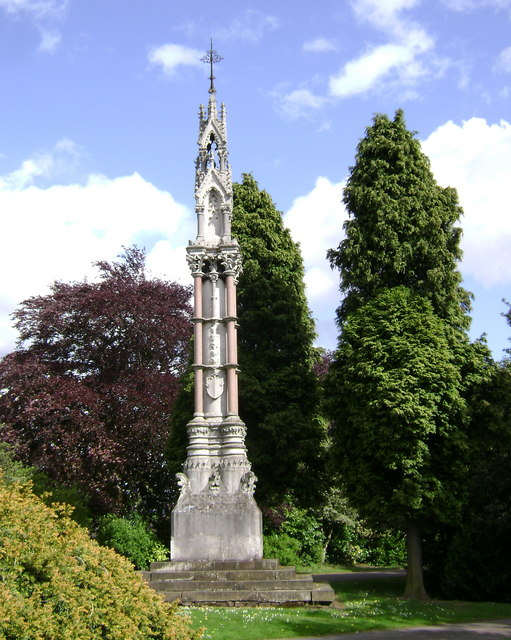
The Paxton Memorial

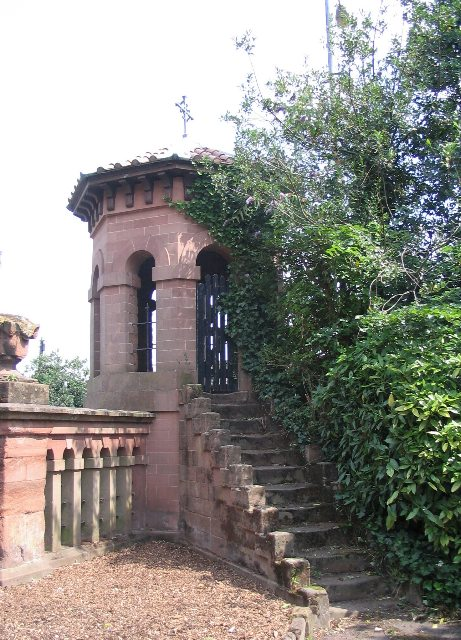
Prospect Tower

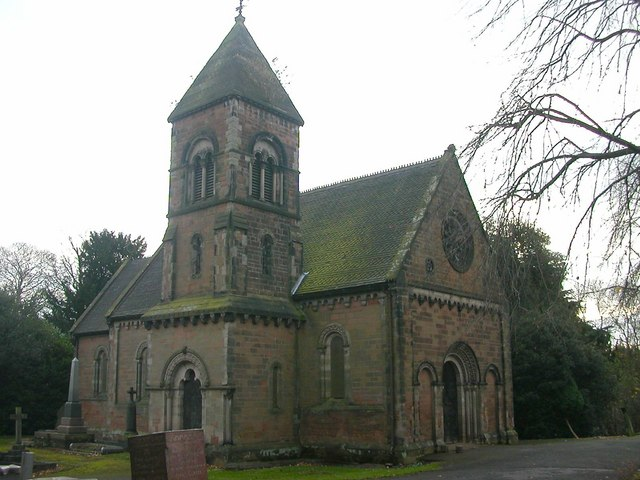
Anglican chapel

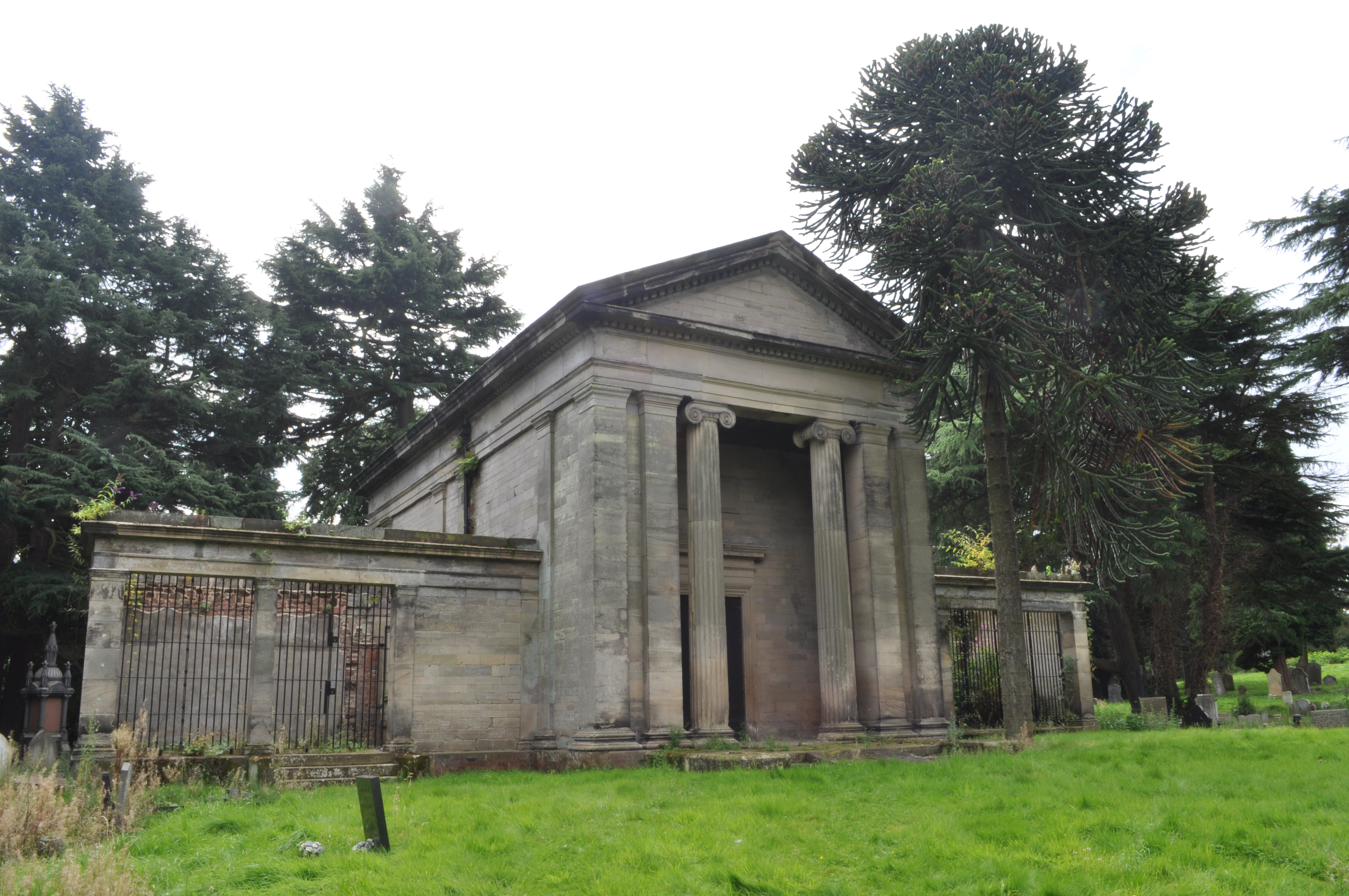
Non-conformist chapel

A number of original buildings and structures survive. They were Grade II* listed as a group on 24 June 1974 and include:

- The entrance lodge
- Prospect Tower
- the Paxton Memorial, by Joseph Goddard, erected in 1868 following Sir Joseph Paxton's death in 1865
- an Anglican chapel
- a non-conformist chapel
- a Jewish chapel

=== Non-conformist chapel ===
The non-conformist chapel is an ashlar classical temple with two storeys and a basement, supported by piers on the corners. The chapel has two large fluted columns at the front with a large portico between them. The building was abandoned after it was damaged during the Second World War. It has not been used since, nor has any restoration been undertaken, and the state of the building is described by English Heritage as "dilapidated".

=== War graves ===
The cemetery contains 94 scattered war graves of Commonwealth service personnel—including Victoria Cross recipient Battery Sergeant-Major Charles Parker (died 1918)—and one Belgian soldier's war grave of the First World War. There are 123 Commonwealth service war graves of the Second World War, 21 of whom are in a group in Square 348. The group includes an officer and six men of a Royal Engineers bomb disposal team who were killed when a bomb they were working on after an air raid exploded. In addition to military graves, 808 civilian victims of the Coventry Blitz lie in a mass grave in the cemetery.

=== Notable burials ===
- David Danskin (1863–1948) Scottish-born founding player in Arsenal F.C.
- Mary Eaves (1805/6–1875), midwife.
- James Starley (1830–1881), industrialist, inventor and father of the bicycle industry.

Contrary to an urban myth, there is no record of the Scottish stage and film actress Mary Ure (1933–1975) being buried there. She was married to actor Robert Shaw. It is thought this has been confused with another "London Road Cemetery" elsewhere, although her actual burial place is unconfirmed/unknown.
