= Justice of the Common Pleas =

Puisne judicial position

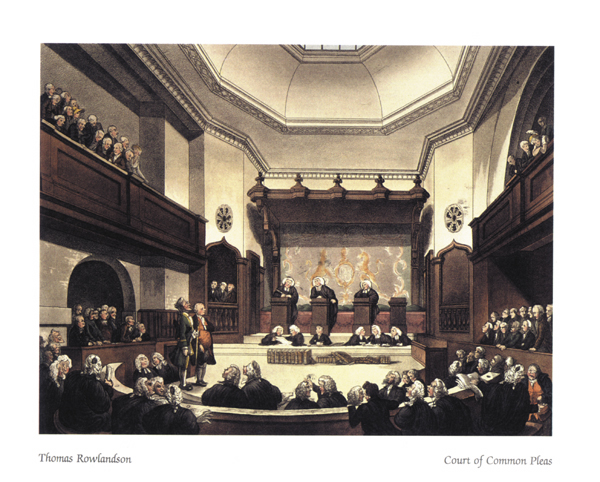
The Court of Common Pleas in 1822

Justice of the Common Pleas was a puisne judicial position within the Court of Common Pleas of England and Wales, under the Chief Justice. The Common Pleas was the primary court of common law within England and Wales, dealing with "common" pleas (civil matters between subject and subject). It was created out of the common law jurisdiction of the Exchequer of Pleas, with splits forming during the 1190s and the division becoming formal by the beginning of the 13th century. The court became a key part of the Westminster courts, along with the Exchequer of Pleas (qualified to hear cases involving revenue owed to the King) and the Court of King's Bench (authorised to hear cases involving the King), but with the Writ of Quominus and the Statute of Westminster, both tried to extend their jurisdiction into the realm of common pleas. As a result, the courts jockeyed for power. In 1828 Henry Brougham, a Member of Parliament, complained in Parliament that as long as there were three courts unevenness was inevitable, saying that "It is not in the power of the courts, even if all were monopolies and other restrictions done away, to distribute business equally, as long as suitors are left free to choose their own tribunal", and that there would always be a favourite court, which would therefore attract the best lawyers and judges and entrench its position. The outcome was the Supreme Court of Judicature Act 1873, under which all the central courts were made part of a single Supreme Court of Judicature. Eventually the government created a High Court of Justice under Lord Coleridge by an Order in Council of 16 December 1880. At this point, the Common Pleas formally ceased to exist.

The number of Justices at any one time varied; between 1377 and 1420 there were generally four, switching to five from 1420 to 1471. From 1471 onwards, the number was fixed at 3. This changed in the 19th century; provisions were made for the appointment of a Fourth Justice and Fifth Justice in 1830 and 1868 respectively. From the start of the 14th century, Justices were appointed via letters patent made under the Great Seal, and held their appointments "under the pleasure of the King". Justices received the same remuneration as judges of the Exchequer of Pleas and Court of King's Bench; £1,000 in 1660, increased to £2,000 in 1759 and £4,000 in 1809. From 1799, pensions were also awarded to retiring Justices.

== List of Justices ==
Name	Born/Died	Active service	Reason for termination	Notes
Simon of Pattishall	d. c. 1217	1190 – 1206	Became Chief Justice of the Common Pleas	
Thomas of Moulton	d. 1240	1224 – 1229	Became Chief Justice of the Common Pleas	
Robert of Lexinton	d. 1250	1227 – 1236	Became Chief Justice of the Common Pleas	
William de Raley	d. 1250	1229 – 1233	Became Chief Justice of the Common Pleas	
Robert of Nottingham	d. 1245	1245	Died in office	
Henry of Bath	d. 1260	1238 – 1241	Went on a trip to Ireland and was made Chief Justice of the Common Pleas when he returned	
Roger of Thirkleby	d. 1260	1242 – 1249	Became Chief Justice of the Common Pleas	
Gilbert of Preston	c. 1209 – 1274	1240–1260	Became Chief Justice of the Common Pleas	
Roger of Seaton	c. 1230 – c. 1280	1270 – 1274	Became Chief Justice of the Common Pleas	
Stephen Heym	d. 1275	1271 – 1274	Died between sessions	
Robert Fulks		10 April 1271 – 1274		
Ralph de Hengham	c. 1235 – 18 May 1311	1273 – 1274	Became Chief Justice of the King's Bench	
William Weyland	d. 25 March 1274	1273 – 1274	Died	
John Cobham		1273 – 1276	Became a Baron of the Exchequer	
Richard de Stanes	d. 1277	1274 – 1276	Became Chancellor of the Exchequer	
Thomas Weyland	c. 1230 – January 1298	1274 – 1278	Became Chief Justice of the Common Pleas	
John de Lovetot	d. 1294	1275 – 1289	Disgraced after failing to prevent Thomas Weyland from altering court documents	
Ralph de Farningham		1275 – 1278		
Roger de Leicester		1276 – 1289	Removed for "extortion and other judicial crimes"	
Walter de Helyun		1278 – 1281		
William de Brompton		1278 – 1289	Removed and imprisoned in the Tower of London for "corruption in his office".	
Elias Beckingham	d. 1307	14 October 1285 – 1307	Died	
Robert Hertford		15 January 1290 – 1294		
William Gisleham	d. January 1293	15 January 1290 – January 1293	Died	
Robert Thorp	d. 1291	15 January 1290 – 1291	Died	
William Bereford		7 February 1292 – 1309	Becomes Chief Justice of the Common Pleas	
Peter Mallore	d. 1311	28 August 1292 – 1308		
William Howard	d. 1308	8 October 1297 – 24 August 1308	Died	
Lambert de Trickingham		1300 – 1316	Became a justice of the King's Bench	
Henry de Guldeford		22 November 1305 – 1306		
Hervey de Stanton	c. 1260 – November 1327	20 April 1306 – 28 September 1314	Became a Baron of the Exchequer	
Henry le Stanton		20 November 1308 – 15 June 1317; 5 February 1327 – 28 October 1329	Became Chief Justice of the King's Bench; Again appointed Chief Justice of the King's Bench	
John de Benstede	d. 1323	6 October 1309 – 16 October 1320	Retired	
William de Bourne		6 October 1309 – ?		
William Inge	c. 1260 – May 1322	23 January 1313 – 1316	Became Chief Justice of the King's Bench	
John Bacon	c. 1250 – c. 1323	29 February 1313 – 16 October 1320		
Gilbert de Rothbury	c. 1260 – 1321	10 March 1316 – 1321	Died	
John Mutford	c. 1258 – 1329	20 April 1316 – 1329	Died	
John Doncaster	d. 1331	5 June 1319 – 15 October 1320		
William Herle	c. 1270 – 1347	6 August 1320 – 29 January 1327	Became Chief Justice of the Common Pleas	
John Stonor	c. 1281 – August 1354	6 August 1320 – 22 February 1329; 1 April 1331 – 7 July 1335	Became Chief Baron of the Exchequer; Became Chief Justice of the Common Pleas	
John de Bourchier		31 May 1321 – 1329		
Walter Friskeney		9 July 1323 – 3 May 1324; 31 January 1327 – 6 March 1327	Became a Justice of the King's Bench; Became a Justice of the King's Bench	
Geoffrey le Scrope	d. 2 December 1340	27 September 1323 – 21 March 1324	Became Chief Justice of the King's Bench	
Henry le Scrope	c. 1268 – 7 September 1336	5 February 1327 – 28 October 1329	Became Chief Justice of the King's Bench	
Richard Willoughby	c. 1290 – 14 March 1362	6 March 1328 – 22 December 1330; 9 October 1340 – November 1341; 20 November 1343 – 1357	Became a Justice of the King's Bench; Arrested for corruption Retired	
John Travers		2 March 1329 – April 1331	Became Chief Justice of the King's Bench	
Thomas Bacon	d. 1336	30 December 1329 – 28 January 1332	Became a Justice of the King's Bench	
Robert de Malberthorp	d. 1332	18 January 1331 – October 1331	Retired	
John Cambridge	d. 1335	18 January 1331 – October 1334	Retired	
John Inge		18 January 1331 – October 1340		
John Shardelow	d. 5 March 1344	29 January 1332 – October 1340; 16 May 1342 – 5 March 1344	Died	
Richard de Aldeburgh		29 January 1332 – October 1340; 16 May 1342 – 5 March 1344	Died	
William de Shareshull	1289/90 — 1370	30 May 1333 – 20 March 1334; 14 May 1334 – 1340; 1346 – 1350	Became a Justice of the King's Bench; Removed by Edward III; Became Chief Justice of the King's Bench	
John de Trevanion		24 September 1334 – 1334	Died	
William Basset		1337 – 28 October 1341	Died	
Roger Hillary	d. 1356	18 March 1337 – 8 January 1341; 4 June 1432 – 20 February 1354	Became Chief Justice of the Common Pleas in Ireland; Became Chief Justice of the Common Pleas	
William Scott	d.1352/6	18 March 1337 – 2 May 1339	Became a Justice of the King's Bench	
James Woodstock	d. 1341	4 February 1340 – 3 January 1341	Died	
Robert Parving		23 May 1340 – 24 June 1340	Became Chief Justice of the King's Bench	
Thomas de Heppecotes		8 January 1341 – 1342		
Richard de Kelleshull		30 May 1341 – 1354	Retired	
Adam Stonegrave		28 October 1341 – 10 January 1342	Became a Justice of the King's Bench	
John Stouford	d. 1359	25 May 1345 – June 1357		
Thomas Fencotes		14 January 1348 – 30 March 1354	Retired	
Henry Green	d. 1369	6 February 1354 – 1361	Became Chief Justice of the King's Bench	
Thomas Seton	d. 6 May 1360	1355 – 6 May 1360	Died	
Henry Mutlow		4 July 1357 – 1361		
John Mowbray		11 July 1359 – 1373		
William Skipwith	c. 1320 – c. 1398	25 October 1359 – 25 June 1361; 8 October 1376 – 1388	Became Chief Baron of the Exchequer; Retired	
John Knyvet	d. 1381	24 June 1361 – 29 October 1365	Became Chief Justice of the King's Bench	
John Delves		3 February 1364 – 1365		
William Fyncheden	d. 1374	29 October 1365 – 14 April 1371	Became Chief Justice of the Common Pleas	
William Witchingham		29 October 1365 – 1377		
Roger de Kirton	d. 7 December 1383	27 November 1371 – 1380		
John Cavendish		27 November 1371 – 15 July 1372	Became Chief Justice of the King's Bench	
Roger Fulthorpe		27 November 1371 – 1388		
Henry Percy		26 November 1377 – 1380		
Henry Asty	d. 1383	6 December 1380 – 1383	Died	
John Burgh		4 November 1383 – 1388		
John Holt	d. 1418	4 November 1383 – 1388		
William Thirning		11 April 1388 – 15 January 1396	Became Chief Justice of the Common Pleas	
William Rickhill	d. 1407	20 May 1389 – 1407	Died	
John Wadham	d. 27 July 1412	20 May 1389 – 10 May 1398	Retired	
Richard Sydenham		20 May 1389 – 1396		
John Markham	d. 31 December 1409	7 July 1396 – 1408	Died	
William Hankeford	c. 1350 – 12 December 1423	6 May 1398 – 29 March 1413	Became Chief Justice of the King's Bench	
William Brenchley	d. 20 May 1406	6 May 1398 – 20 May 1406	Died	
John Cokayn	d. 1429	14 May 1405 – 1429	Died	
John Colepeper	d. 30 August 1414	17 June 1406 – 30 August 1414	Died	
Robert Hill	d. 1425	14 May 1408 – 1423		
Richard Norton	d. 20 December 1420	2 May 1413 – 26 June 1413	Became Chief Justice of the Common Pleas	
William Lodington	d. 9 January 1420	16 June 1415 – 9 January 1420	Died	
John Preston	d. 29 September 1434	16 June 1415 – 28 January 1428	Retired	
William Babington	c. 1370 – 13 October 1454	30 June 1420 – 5 May 1423	Became Chief Justice of the Common Pleas	
John Martin	d. 24 October 1436	13 October 1420 – 24 October 1436	Died	
John Juyn	d. 24 March 1440	5 May 1423 – 9 February 1436	Became Chief Justice of the Common Pleas	
John Hals		5 May 1423 – 23 January 1424	Became a Justice of the King's Bench	
James Strangways	c. 1410 – August 1480	6 February 1426 – 16 March 1443	Died	
John Cottesmore	d. 29 October 1439	15 October 1429 – 20 January 1439	Became Chief Justice of the Common Pleas	
William Paston	d. 14 August 1444	15 October 1429 – 14 August 1444	Died	
Richard Newton	d. 13 December 1448	8 November 1438 – 17 September 1439	Became Chief Justice of the Common Pleas	
Thomas Fulthorpe	d. 3 May 1457	29 January 1439 – 3 May 1457	Died	
William Ayscough	d. 30 July 1454	17 April 1440 – 30 July 1454	Died	
John Portington	d. 2 June 1454	1 July 1443 – 2 June 1454	Died	
Nicholas Aysshton	d. 12 March 1466	9 October 1444 – 12 March 1466	Died	
Peter Arden	d. 2 June 1467	7 June 1448 – 2 June 1467	Died	
Robert Danvers	d. 17 April 1467	14 August 1450 – 17 April 1467	Died	
Robert Danby	d. 1474	28 June 1453 – 11 May 1461	Became Chief Justice of the Common Pleas	
Walter Moyle	c. 1405 – 11 December 1479	9 July 1454 – 11 December 1479	Died	
John Needham		9 May 1457 – 17 June 1471	Became a Justice of the King's Bench	
Richard Choke	d. 5 July 1483	5 September 1461 – 5 July 1483	Died	
Thomas de Littleton	d. 23 August 1481	27 April 1466 – 23 August 1481	Died	
Thomas Yonge	c. 1405 – 3/4 May 1477	4 November 1467 – 29 April 1475	Became a Justice of the King's Bench	
Richard Nele	d. 15 June 1486	17 June 1471 – 15 June 1486	Died	
John Catesby	d. 23 January 1487	20 November 1481 – 23 January 1487	Died	
Humphrey Starkey	d. 27 August 1486	27 June 1483 – 27 August 1486	Died	
Roger Townshend	c. 1430 – 9 November 1493	20 September 1485 – 9 November 1493	Died	
John Haugh	d. 14 March 1489	10 December 1486 – 14 March 1489	Died	
William Callow	d. 29 July 1487	31 January 1487 – 29 July 1487	Died	
William Danvers	d. 17 April 1504	5 February 1488 – 17 April 1504	Died	
John Vavasour	d. 26 November 1506	17 October 1489 – 16 October 1506	Retired	
John Fineux		11 February 1494 – 24 November 1495	Became Chief Justice of the King's Bench	
Thomas Wode	d. 31 August 1502	24 November 1495 – 28 October 1500	Became Chief Justice of the Common Pleas	
John Fisher	d. 1 May 1510	3 November 1501 – 1 May 1510	Died	
John Kingsmill	d. 11 May 1509	2 July 1504 – 11 May 1509	Died	
John Butler	d. 15 December 1517	26 April 1508 – 15 December 1517	Died	
William Greville	d. 9 March 1513	21 May 1509 – 9 March 1513	Died	
William Fairfax	— 11 May 1514	26 June 1510 – 11 May 1514	Died	
Richard Elyot	d. 20 May 1522	26 April 1513 – 20 May 1522	Died	
Lewis Pollard	d. 21 October 1526	29 May 1514 – 21 October 1526	Died	
John More	c. 1451 – 5 November 1530	23 January 1518 – 23 April 1520	Became a Justice of the King's Bench	
Richard Broke	d. May 1529	29 April 1520 – 24 January 1526	Became Chief Baron of the Exchequer	
Anthony Fitzherbert	c.1470 – 27 May 1538	20 May 1522 – 27 May 1538	Died	
Thomas Englefield	d. 28 September 1537	12 November 1526 – 28 September 1537	Died	
William Shelley	1478/9 — 4 January 1549	17 November 1526 – 4 January 1549	Died	
Thomas Willoughby	d. 29 September 1545	9 October 1537 – 29 September 1545	Died	
Christopher Jenney	d. 20 November 1542	30 June 1538 – 20 November 1542	Died	
Humphrey Browne	d. 5 December 1562	20 November 1542 – 5 December 1562	Died	
John Hynde	c.1480 – 17 October 1550	24 November 1545 – 17 October 1550	Died	
James Hales	c.1500 – 4 August 1554	20 May 1549 – 4 August 1554	Died	
Edmund Molyneux	d. 28 August 1552	22 October 1550 – 28 August 1552	Died	
William Coke	d. 24 August 1553	16 November 1552 – 24 August 1553	Died	
Edward Saunders	4 April 1506 – 12 November 1576	4 October 1553 – 8 May 1557	Became Chief Justice of the Queen's Bench	
William Stanford	20 August 1509 – 28 August 1558	1554 – 28 August 1558	Died	
James Dyer	1510 – 24 March 1582	8 May 1557 – 22 January 1559	Became Chief Justice of the Common Pleas	
Robert Catlyn	c.1510 – 16 September 1574	27 October 1558 – 22 January 1559	Became Chief Justice of the Queen's Bench	
Anthony Browne	1509/10 — 5 May 1567	22 January 1559 – 5 May 1567	Died	
Richard Weston	d. 6 July 1572	16 October 1559 – 6 July 1572	Died	
John Walsh, of Cathanger, Fivehead, Somerset	d. 12 February 1572	10 February 1563 – 12 February 1572	Died	
Richard Harpur	d. 29 January 1577	16 May 1567 – 29 January 1577	Died	
Roger Manwood	1524/5 — 14 December 1592	14 October 1572 – 17 November 1578	Became Chief Baron of the Exchequer	
Robert Monson	c. 1525 – 24 September 1583	31 October 1572 – 25 March 1580	Retired	
Thomas Mead	d. 26 May 1585	1 December 1577 – 26 May 1585	Died	
Francis Wyndham	d. 18 June 1592	21 June 1579 – 18 June 1592	Died	
William Peryam	1534 – 9 October 1604	13 February 1581 – 7 February 1593	Became Chief Baron of the Exchequer	
Francis Rodes	1524/5 — 17 January 1589	19 June 1585 – 17 January 1589	Died	
Thomas Walmsley	d. 26 November 1612	10 May 1589 – 26 November 1612	Died	
Francis Beaumont	d. 22 April 1598	25 January 1593 – 22 April 1598	Died	
Thomas Owen	d. 21 December 1598	21 January 1594 – 21 December 1598	Died	
John Glanville	1542 – 27 July 1600	30 June 1598 – 27 July 1600	Died	
George Kingsmill	d. 20 March 1606	8 February 1599 – 29 September 1605	Retired	
Peter Warburton	c. 1540 – 7 September 1621	24 November 1600 – 7 September 1621	Retired	
William Daniel	d. 19 May 1610	3 February 1604 – 19 May 1610	Died	
Thomas Coventry	1547 – 12 December 1606	13 January 1606 – 12 December 1606	Died	
Thomas Foster	10 August 1548 – 18 May 1612	24 November 1607 – 18 May 1612	Died	
Humphrey Winch	1554/5 — 4 February 1625	7 November 1611 – 4 February 1625	Died	
Augustine Nicolls	April 1559 – 3 August 1616	26 November 1612 – 3 August 1616	Died	
Richard Hutton	d. 26 February 1639	3 May 1617 – 26 February 1639	Died	
William Jones	1566 – 6 December 1640	25 September 1621 – 17 October 1624	Became a Justice of the King's Bench	
Francis Harvey	c. 1568 – 2 August 1632	18 October 1624 – 2 August 1632	Died	
Thomas Chamberlayne	d. 27 September 1625	20 October 1624 – 27 September 1625	Died	
George Croke	c. 1560 – 16 February 1642	11 February 1625 – 9 October 1628	Became a Justice of the King's Bench	
Henry Yelverton	29 June 1566 – 24 January 1630	10 May 1625 – 24 January 1630	Died	
Humphrey Davenport	c. 1566 – March 1645	2 February 1630 – 10 January 1631	Became Chief Baron of the Exchequer	
George Vernon	c. 1578 – 16 December 1639	8 May 1631 – 16 December 1639	Died	
Francis Crawley	1574/5 — 13 February 1650	11 October 1632 – 24 November 1645	Appointed by the king, Crawley was disabled by Parliament	
Edmund Reeve	c. 1589 – 27 March 1647	24 March 1639 – 27 March 1647	Died	
Robert Foster	1589 – 27 March 1647	27 January 1640 – 24 November 1645; 31 May 1660 – 21 October 1660	Appointed by the king, Foster was disabled by Parliament; Following the English Restoration, Foster was restored to the court before becoming Chief Justice of the King's Bench	
Peter Phesant	1584 – 1 October 1649	7 October 1645 – 1 October 1649	Died	
John Godbolt	d. 3 August 1648	1 May 1647 – 3 August 1648	Died	
Richard Cresheld	d. 1652	18 October 1648 – 8 February 1649	Retired	
Thomas Bedingfield	1591/2 — 24 March 1661	22 November 1648 – 8 February 1649	Retired	
John Puleston	c. 1583 – 5 September 1659	12 June 1649 – 1654	Retired	
Peter Warburton	27 March 1588 – 28 February 1666	12 June 1649 – 1654	Retired	
Edward Atkyns	1587 – 9 October 1669	23 October 1649 – January 1660	Retired	
Matthew Hale	1 November 1609 – 25 December 1676	31 January 1653 – May 1659	Retired	
Hugh Wyndham	1602/3 — 27 July 1684	30 May 1654 – May 1661; 22 January 1673 – 27 July 1684	Not reappointed Died	
John Archer	1598 – 8 February 1682	11 February 1659 – May 1661; 4 November 1663 – 8 February 1682	Not reappointed Died	
Robert Hyde	1595/6 — 1 May 1665	31 May 1660 – 19 October 1663	Became Chief Justice of the King's Bench	
Thomas Tyrrell	1593/4 — 8 March 1672	7 July 1660 – 8 March 1672	Died	
Samuel Browne	c. 1598 – 11 April 1668	3 November 1660 – 11 April 1668	Died	
William Wilde	c. 1611 – 11 April 1668	16 April 1668 – 21 January 1673	Became a Justice of the King's Bench	
Robert Atkyns	d. 18 February 1710	25 April 1672 – 17 April 1689	Became Chief Baron of the Exchequer	
William Ellis	July 1609 – 3 December 1680	18 December 1672 – 4 July 1676; 30 April 1679 – 3 December 1680	Removed; Died	
William Scroggs	c. 1623 – 24 January 1695	23 October 1676 – 31 May 1678	Became Chief Justice of the King's Bench	
Vere Bertie	c. 1638 – 23 February 1681	15 June 1678 – 29 April 1679	Removed	
Thomas Raymond	1626/7 — 14 July 1683	7 February 1680 – 24 April 1680	Became a Justice of the King's Bench	
Job Charlton	c. 1614 – 27 May 1697	26 April 1680 – 20 April 1686	Removed	
Creswell Levinz	1627 – 29 January 1701	12 February 1681 – 9 February 1686	Removed	
Thomas Street	d. 8 March 1696	29 October 1684 – 1689	Not reappointed on the accession of William III and Mary II	
Henry Bedingfield	1632 – 6 February 1687	10 February 1686 – 21 April 1686	Became Chief Justice of the Common Pleas	
Edward Lutwyche	6 September 1634 – 11 June 1709	21 April 1686 – 1689	Not reappointed on the accession of William III and Mary II	
John Powell	1632/3 — 7 September 1696	24 April 1686 – 13 April 1687; 18 March 1689 – 7 September 1696	Became a Justice of the King's Bench; Died	
Christopher Milton	1615 – March 1693	14 April 1687 – 6 July 1688	Removed	
Thomas Jenner	1638 – 31 December 1706	6 July 1688 – 1689	Not reappointed on the accession of William III and Mary II	
William Gregory	1 March 1625 – 28 May 1696	18 April 1689 – 8 May 1689	Became a Justice of the King's Bench	
Thomas Rokeby	c. 1631 – 26 November 1699	8 May 1689 – 25 October 1695	Became a Justice of the King's Bench	
Peyton Ventris	November 1645 – 6 April 1691	9 May 1689 – 6 April 1691	Died	
Edward Neville	d. 7 August 1705	30 October 1691 – 7 August 1705	Died	
John Powell	26 May 1645 – 14 June 1713	26 October 1695 – 23 June 1702	Became a Justice of the King's Bench	
John Blencowe	30 November 1642 – 8 May 1726	24 November 1697 – 22 June 1722	Retired	
Robert Tracy	1655 – 11 September 1735	23 June 1702 – 26 October 1726	Retired	
Robert Dormer	d. 18 September 1726	11 February 1706 – 18 September 1726	Died	
Alexander Denton	d. 22 March 1740	25 June 1722 – 22 March 1740	Died	
Robert Price	14 January 1655 – 2 February 1733	20 October 1726 – 2 February 1733	Died	
Francis Page	1660/1 — 19 December 1741	4 November 1726 – 27 September 1727	Became a Justice of the King's Bench	
Spencer Cowper	23 February 1670 – 10 December 1728	24 October 1727 – 10 December 1728	Died	
John Fortescue Aland	7 March 1670 – 19 December 1746	23 January 1729 – 25 June 1746	Resigned	
Thomas Reeve	1672/3 — 19 January 1737	15 April 1733 – 26 January 1736	Became Chief Justice of the Common Pleas	
John Comyns	c. 1667 – 13 November 1740	5 February 1736 – 7 July 1738	Became Chief Baron of the Exchequer	
William Fortescue	d. 16 December 1749	7 July 1738 – 5 November 1741	Became Master of the Rolls	
Thomas Parker	d. 29 December 1784	21 April 1740 – 29 November 1742	Became Chief Baron of the Exchequer	
Thomas Burnet	19 February 1694 – 7 January 1753	5 November 1741 – 7 January 1753	Died	
Thomas Abney	1690/1 — 7 January 1753	10 February 1743 – 19 May 1750	Died	
Thomas Birch	d. 12 March 1757	24 June 1746 – 12 March 1757	Died	
Nathaniel Gundry	d. 30 March 1754	23 June 1750 – 30 March 1754	Died	
Edward Clive	1704 – 18 April 1771	29 January 1753 – 13 February 1770	Retired	
Henry Bathurst	20 May 1714 – 6 August 1794	2 May 1754 – 23 January 1771	Became Lord Chancellor	
William Noel	19 March 1695 – 8 December 1762	3 May 1757 – 8 December 1762	Died	
Henry Gould	1710 – 5 March 1794	15 December 1762 – 5 March 1794	Died	
Joseph Yates	1722 – 7 June 1770	16 February 1770 – 7 June 1770	Died	
William Blackstone	10 July 1723 – 14 February 1780	25 June 1770 – 14 February 1780	Died	
George Nares	1716 – 20 July 1786	26 January 1771 – 20 July 1786	Died	
John Heath	1736 – 16 January 1816	7 July 1780 – 16 January 1816	Died	
John Wilson	6 August 1741 – 18 October 1793	6 November 1786 – 18 October 1793	Died	
Giles Rooke	3 June 1743 – 7 March 1808	7 November 1793 – 7 March 1808	Died	
Soulden Lawrence	1751 – 8 July 1814	7 March 1794 – 18 June 1794; 31 March 1808 – 28 May 1812	Became a Justice of the King's Bench; Retired	
Francis Buller	17 March 1746 – 4 June 1800	18 June 1794 – 4 June 1800	Died	
Alan Chambre	4 October 1739 – 20 September 1823	11 June 1800 – 11 January 1816	Retired	
Vicary Gibbs	27 October 1751 – 8 February 1820	29 May 1812 – 6 November 1813	Became Chief Baron of the Exchequer	
Robert Dallas	16 October 1756 – 25 December 1824	18 November 1813 – 4 November 1818	Became Chief Justice of the Common Pleas	
James Allan Park	6 April 1763 – 8 December 1838	23 January 1816 – 8 December 1838	Died	
Charles Abbott	7 October 1762 – 4 November 1832	12 February 1816 – 2 May 1816	Became a Justice of the King's Bench	
James Burrough	August 1749 – 25 March 1837	4 May 1816 – 16 January 1830	Retired	
John Richardson	3 March 1771 – 19 March 1841	30 November 1818 – 18 June 1824	Retired	
Stephen Gaselee	d. 26 March 1839	5 July 1824 – 22 February 1837	Retired	
John Bosanquet	2 May 1773 – 25 September 1847	1 February 1830 – 16 January 1842	Retired	
Edward Hall Alderson	d. 27 January 1857	1 November 1830 – 29 April 1834	Became a Baron of the Exchequer	
John Vaughan	11 February 1769 – 25 September 1839	29 April 1834 – 25 September 1839	Died	
Thomas Coltman	d. 11 July 1849	23 February 1837 – 11 July 1849	Died	
Thomas Erskine	12 March 1788 – 9 November 1864	9 January 1839 – 4 November 1844	Retired	
William Henry Maule	25 April 1788 – 16 January 1858	11 November 1839 – 3 July 1855	Retired	
Cresswell Cresswell	20 August 1793 – 29 July 1863	26 January 1842 – 11 January 1858	Became a judge of the newly created Court for Divorce and Matrimonial Causes	
William Erle	1 October 1793 – 28 January 1880	6 November 1844 – 27 October 1846	Became a justice of the Queen's Bench	
Edward Vaughan Williams	1797 – 2 November 1875	27 October 1846 – 7 February 1865	Retired	
Thomas Noon Talfourd	26 May 1795 – 13 March 1854	28 July 1849 – 13 March 1854	Died	
Richard Crowder	17 May 1796 — 5 December 1859	24 March 1854 – 5 December 1859	Died	
James Shaw Willes	13 February 1814 – 2 October 1872	3 July 1855 – 2 October 1872	Died	
John Barnard Byles	11 January 1801 – 3 February 1884	9 January 1858 – 23 January 1873	Retired	
Henry Singer Keating	13 January 1804 – 1 October 1888	14 December 1859 – 5 February 1875	Retired	
Montague Edward Smith	25 December 1806 – 3 May 1891	7 February 1865 – 3 November 1871	Became a member of the Privy Council	
William Brett	13 August 1815 – 5 December 1859	24 August 1868 – 1 November 1875	Became a judge of the High Court of Justice (Common Pleas Division)	
Robert Collier	21 June 1817 – 27 October 1886	7 November 1871 – 22 November 1871	Became a member of the Privy Council	
William Robert Grove	11 July 1811 – 1 August 1896	30 November 1871 – 1 November 1875	Became a judge of the High Court of Justice (Common Pleas Division)	
George Denman	23 December 1819 – 21 December 1896	17 October 1872 – 1 November 1875	Became a judge of the High Court of Justice (Common Pleas Division)	
George Honyman	22 January 1819 – 16 September 1875	23 January 1873 – 18 February 1875	Retired	
Thomas Dickson Archibald	1817 – 18 October 1876	6 February 1875 – 1 November 1875	Became a judge of the High Court of Justice (Common Pleas Division)	
John Walter Huddleston	8 September 1815 – 5 December 1890	22 February 1875 – 12 May 1875	Became a Baron of the Exchequer	
Nathaniel Lindley	29 November 1828 – 9 December 1921	12 May 1875 – 1 November 1875	Became a judge of the High Court of Justice (Common Pleas Division)	

== Bibliography ==
- Brougham, Henry (1828). Present State of the Law. Lea & Carey. OCLC 213519284.
- Foss, Edward (1870). A Biographical Dictionary of the Justices of England (1066 - 1870). Spottiswoode and Company. OCLC 181068114.
- Kemp, Brian (1973). "Exchequer and Bench in the Later Twelfth Century -- Separate or Identical Tribunals?". The English Historical Review. 88 (348). Oxford University Press. ISSN 0013-8266.
- Mackay, James (2002). Halsbury's Laws of England. Vol. 10 (4th ed.). LexisNexis. ISBN 90-411-1742-3.
- Sainty, John (1993). The Judges of England 1272 -1990: a list of judges of the superior courts. Oxford: Selden Society. OCLC 29670782.
