= Elias Beckingham =

14th-century English priest and judge

Ellis Beckingham, named Ellis of Beckingham in some sources, (died 1307?) was a parish priest for Warmington, Northamptonshire, which at the time was under the authority of Peterborough Abbey, and with which Beckingham had a close relationship throughout his life. He both assisted the Abbey legally and increased his wealth through their grants. He was also a royal judge, and is possibly best known for being the only English judge to keep his position when most of his colleagues were dismissed. As a result, he has been called "with one exception the only honest judge" of the time. The dates of his birth and death are unknown, but he is thought to have died in around 1307.

== Early life ==
Elias Beckingham came from Beckingham, in Lincolnshire, although his date of birth is unknown. It is likely, however, that by the time he was first mentioned in administrative documents (in 1258), he was already holding a "relatively senior" position in the judiciary. Elias had at least one sister Isolde Beckingham, and through her a niece and a nephew.

== Judicial career ==
Beckingham at the time he was mentioned in 1258 was working, probably as chief clerk, for Gilbert of Preston, the English crown's senior royal justice. This was an itinerant position, travelling in a circuit (or eyre); Gilbert's last eyre – and therefore also Beckingham's as his chief clerk – was that of 1268–72. In 1274, Beckingham himself was named an itinerant justice for Middlesex, although as yet this was not a permanent position and he was replaced by the next year. At this time he seems to have held the rank of king's serjeant. He received the commission of justice of assize in 1276. From 1273 to 1278, he was a senior clerk to the Court of Common Pleas, and was then made keeper of the writs and rolls of the court (custos rotulorum et brevium de banco) until 1285. In that year, Beckingham was appointed a Justice of the Common Pleas.

In 1289, grave complaints arose of the maladministration of the entire justice system during King Edward I's absence in Gascony. The wide-ranging royal enquiry that followed in 1290 found that Thomas Weyland, Chief Justice of the Common Pleas had, among other offences, erased an entry in the plea rolls and substituted a false one, evidently in collusion with a party to the case. Weyland's offences were severe enough that he had his goods and chattels confiscated and he was exiled from the realm. Weyland, three of the four other Justices of the Common Pleas (who did not participate in the fraud but were held responsible for not preventing it), and the Master of the Rolls were heavily fined. The three judges of the Court of King's Bench were also dismissed. Beckingham was the only Justice of the Common Pleas acquitted of the charges. He thereby gained a historical record for probity. More recently, it has been suggested that his escape from censure may simply have been due to his absence from Westminster Hall the previous year whilst on the Dorsetshire eyre, where it is known that fines were levied before him, and the Lyme Regis burgess' pleas to Queen Eleanor heard. He appears to have continued in the discharge of his duties until 1307, for he was regularly summoned to parliament as a justice between 1288 and 1305. From the fact that he was no longer summoned to parliament after the latter date, it may be inferred that he died or retired before the date when parliament next met. His work within the courts seems to have leaned towards the "more routine" procedural aspects of court work.

== Estates ==
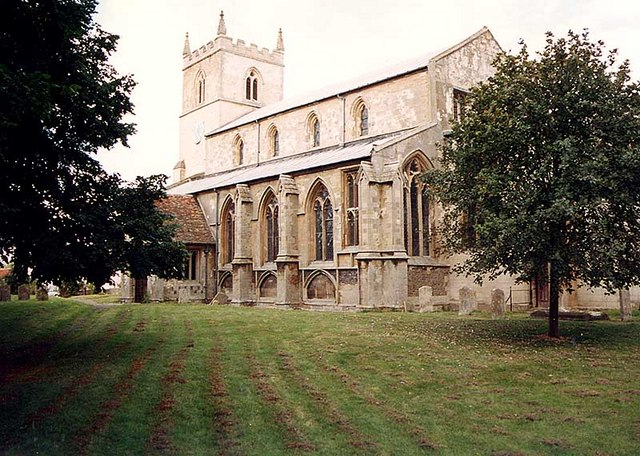
Holy Trinity, Bottisham.

Beckingham appears to have been one of if not the richest man in the parish, although he was still only a free tenant of Bottisham rather than a lord of the manor. In 1275, he bought a moiety of 48 acres (19 hectares) in Bottisham, Cambridgeshire, constituting a quarter of the "Deresley fee", a half of a knight's fee held from the lord of the manor of Bottisham (then Maud de Lacy, Countess of Hertford and Gloucester). These holdings were later recognized as the manor of Vauxes. Likewise, purchases of manors such as those in Nene Valley and Stoke by Newark enabled him to invest his wealth in land. His ecclesiastical status meant that he could also rely on a succession of livings, not only those in Cambridgeshire, but as far afield as Rutland, Devon, and Cornwall.

== Relations with Peterborough Abbey ==
Born in Beckingham, which itself had a satellite church of Peterborough Abbey his relations with the Abbey seem to have been close. Prior to their appointment of him as a parish priest at Warmington in 1281, they had appointed him to Northborough parish twelve years earlier; but his second parish was by far the most lucrative. In him, it has been said, "Peterborough had found a royal justice, bound in loyalty by the grant." For example, in 1288 he granted the Abbey his manor of Southorpe, and when eventually the Abbey came to buy it, Beckingham lent them some of the cash to do so. In this way, contemporaries noted, Beckingham enabled the Abbey to circumvent the king's statute against land passing to the Church. As some point he appears to have also acted as agent and money lender for the Abbey, as well as hearing their cases that came before him personally in court, for instance, in the Abbey's purchase of Polebrook manor and when the Abbey found itself in dispute with the bishop of Lincoln and other Abbeys. He also acted administratively such as witnessing oaths of homage to the Abbey.

== Bottisham, and death ==
It seems likely that Beckingham was responsible for building the nave of Holy Trinity Church in Bottisham, Cambridgeshire, in what has been described as "a fitting tribute to the climax of [his] career, his economic success, and his bond with the village." He was later interred in the same church where a monument – in the "place of honour in the centre of the nave," described as a "raised Purbeck altar tomb" – was dedicated to his memory. This monument had affixed to it a brass, showing Beckingham dressed in clerical robes rather than the official garb of the Bench. The plaque has since been stolen, but the inscription is faintly apparent in the stone beneath. It seems likely that it was removed by iconoclasts during the English Civil War: the inscription, surrounded by angels, was cujus anime propicieteur Deus. (On whose soul may God have mercy.) At some point, Beckingham had given the church a silver chalice. He bequeathed the Abbey land, forest, watermills, and an annual rent of sixty shillings per annum on condition that two monks should daily pray for the Abbey and Queen Eleanor (d.1290) and provide a feast for 200 of the poor on the anniversary of the queen's death.

Having been ordained, Elias Beckingham did not marry and had no children; his estates – those not left to Peterborough Abbey – were settled upon his niece and nephew, the daughter and son of his sister Isolde.
