= Law of the land =

Legal term

The phrase law of the land is a legal term, equivalent to the Latin lex terrae, or legem terrae in the accusative case. It refers to all of the laws in force within a country or region, including statute law and case-made law.

== Use in Magna Carta ==
In the year 1215, this term was used in Magna Carta. Perhaps the most famous clause (number 39 in the 1215 charter, clause 29 in the 1297 statute) of Magna Carta states (emphasis added):

No Freeman shall be taken or imprisoned, or be disseised of his Freehold, or Liberties, or free Customs, or be outlawed, or exiled, or any other wise destroyed; nor will We not pass upon him, nor condemn him, but by lawful judgment of his Peers, or by the Law of the Land.

This is sometimes called the "law of the land clause". Magna Carta was originally written in Latin, and the Latin term is lex terrae, or legem terrae in the accusative case (i.e. when the term is being used as the object in a sentence).

== Emulation of Magna Carta ==
Over 500 years later, following the American Revolution, legislators looked to Magna Carta for inspiration, and emulated its "law of the land" language. Versions of it can be found in the Virginia Constitution of 1776, the Constitution of North Carolina of 1776, the Delaware Constitution of 1776, the Maryland Constitution of 1776, the New York Constitution of 1777, the South Carolina Constitution of 1778, the Massachusetts Constitution of 1780, and the New Hampshire Constitution of 1784.

In 1787, the Continental Congress adopted the Northwest Ordinance for governance of areas in the United States outside of the individual states. Congress wrote: "No man shall be deprived of his liberty or property, but by the judgment of his peers, or the law of the land." Following adoption of the United States Constitution, Congress re-adopted the Northwest Ordinance in 1789.

== Use in the United States Constitution ==
This term was used in 1787 to write the Supremacy Clause of the U.S. Constitution, which states: "This Constitution, and the Laws of the United States which shall be made in Pursuance thereof; and all Treaties made, or which shall be made, under the authority of the United States, shall be the supreme Law of the land...." The Supremacy Clause is the only place in the Constitution where this exact term was used.

== Meaning and interpretation ==
This term has been the subject of numerous scholarly works and judicial decisions over the years. Usually the English term is used, but sometimes the Latin: lex terrae, or legem terrae in the accusative case (i.e. when the term is being used as the object in a sentence).

=== What it includes ===
Judges and barristers have said for many centuries that the words "law of the land" refer to particular legal requirements. For example, William Bereford, Justice of the Common Pleas, said in 1308 that the then-existing "law of the land requires" a tenant to be summoned by two summoners. In 1550, it was said by John Pollard, who was a serjeant-at-law and later Speaker of the House of Commons, that beating and wounding a man is generally "against the law of the land" (subject to exceptions).

British Chief Justice John Fineux stated in 1519 that "the Law of God and the Law of the Land are all one" in the sense that they both protect the public good. British Chief Justice John Vaughan further explained in 1677 that whenever the law of the land declares by a legislative act what divine law is, then the courts must consider that legislation to be correct.

English jurists, writing of legem terrae in reference to Magna Carta, stated that this term embraces all laws that are in force for the time being within a jurisdiction. For example, Edward Coke, commenting upon Magna Carta, wrote in 1606: "no man be taken or imprisoned but per legem terrae, that is, by the common law, statute law, or custom of England." In this context, "custom" refers only to local custom, because general custom of England was considered part of the common law.

Coke also said, as Chief Justice of the Common Pleas in the 1610 Case of Proclamations, that dictates of the King are excluded from the law of the land: "the law of England is divided into three parts, common law, statute law, and custom; but the King's proclamation is none of them." In the same year, he decided Dr Bonham's Case, and the U.S. Supreme Court later discussed how the term "law of the land" should be understood in view of Coke's decision in that case:

[B]ills of attainder, ex post facto laws, laws declaring forfeitures of estates, and other arbitrary acts of legislation which occur so frequently in English history, were never regarded as inconsistent with the law of the land; for notwithstanding what was attributed to Lord COKE in Bonham's Case, 8 Reporter, 115, 118a, the omnipotence of parliament over the common law was absolute, even against common right and reason.

Littleton Powys, a judge of the King's Bench, wrote in 1704 with reference to Magna Carta: "lex terrae is not confined to the common law, but takes in all the other laws, which are in force in this realm; as the civil and canon law...." In 1975, political scientist Keith Jurow asserted that the term "law of the land", as understood by Lord Coke, includes only the common law, but that assertion by Jurow was called "manifestly wrong" in a 1990 article by Brigham Young Law School professor Robert Riggs.

=== Equivalence to due process ===
In 1606, Lord Coke equated this term to due process of law: "But by the Law of the Land. For the true sense and exposition of these words, see the Statute of 37 Edw. 3 cap. 8 where the words, by the law of the Land, are rendered, without due process of Law...." Justice Powys likewise stated in 1704: "By the 28 Ed. 3.c.3. there the words lex terrae, which are used in Mag. Char. are explained by the words, due process of law; and the meaning of the statute is, that all commitments must be by a legal authority."

In 1855, the U.S. Supreme Court said, "The words, 'due process of law,' were undoubtedly intended to convey the same meaning as the words, 'by the law of the land,' in Magna Charta."

Massachusetts Supreme Court Justice Lemuel Shaw wrote in 1857 that, "Lord Coke himself explains his own meaning by saying 'the law of the land,' as expressed in Magna Charta, was intended due process of law, that is, by indictment or presentment of good and lawful men." However, in 1884, the U.S. Supreme Court called this a misunderstanding, saying Coke never meant that indictment by a grand jury is "essential to the idea of due process of law in the prosecution and punishment of crimes, but was only mentioned as an example and illustration of due process of law as it actually existed in cases in which it was customarily used." The Court added:

Due process of law in the [Fourteenth Amendment] refers to that law of the land in each state which derives its authority from the inherent and reserved powers of the state, exerted within the limits of those fundamental principles of liberty and justice which lie at the base of all our civil and political institutions, and the greatest security for which resides in the right of the people to make their own laws, and alter them at their pleasure.

19th century lawyers sometimes identified the law of the land with the common law, to the exclusion of other law. However, by allowing an alternative to grand jury review in the Hurtado case, the Court permitted a procedural reform that departed from the common law. In doing so, the Court said the law of the land in each state should conform with "fundamental principles of liberty and justice".

=== How it changes ===
In 17th century England, Lord Coke wrote that if common law "be not abrogated or altered by parliament, it remains still...." He also said that the power and jurisdiction of parliament is, "so transcendent and absolute as it cannot be confined either for causes or persons within any bounds," and that not even Magna Carta would prevent subsequent statutes contrary to that great charter.

In the eighteenth-century, the English jurist William Blackstone likewise wrote that the law of the land "depends not upon the arbitrary will of any judge; but is permanent, fixed, and unchangeable, unless by authority of parliament.... Not only the substantial part, or judicial decisions, of the law, but also the formal part, or method of proceeding, cannot be altered but by parliament."

== See also ==
- Lex loci
- Law of the sea
