= Roger Brabazon =

British judge

Sir Roger Brabazon

14th Lord Chief Justice of England
- In office 1296 – March 1316
- Monarchs: Edward I Edward II
- Prime Minister: Thomas, Earl of Lancaster (as Lord High Steward)
- Chancellor: John Langton (1296-1302, 1307-1310); William Greenfield (1302-1305); William Hamilton (1305-1307); Ralph Baldock (1307); Walter Reynolds (1310-1314); John Sandale (1314-1316) (as Lord High Chancellors)
- Preceded by: Gilbert de Thornton
- Succeeded by: Sir William Inge

Personal details
- Born: c. 1246 Mowsley, Leicestershire(?)
- Died: 13 June 1317 (aged 69–70)
- Resting place: Old St Paul's Cathedral, London; 51°30′49″N 0°5′54″W

Sir Roger Brabazon (c. 1247 – 13–14 June 1317) was an English lawyer, and Chief Justice of the King's Bench from 1296 to 1316. Little is known of his background, he was the son of William le Brabazon, and may have been born at Mowsley in Leicestershire in or before 1247. Knighted in 1268, Sir Roger was in the service of Edmund of Lancaster from 1275, and through Edmund's patronage he started receiving judicial commissions from the mid-1280s. In 1290, after Ralph de Hengham had been dismissed from the King's Bench, Brabazon was hired as a junior justice.

In 1291–1292, Brabazon took part in hearing the 'Great Cause' concerning Edward I's overlordship over Scotland, and pronounced the judgement in favour of John Balliol as heir to the Scottish crown. Upon the death of Gilbert de Thornton in 1295, Brabazon was then appointed Chief Justice of the King's Bench, a position he held until old age and infirmity forced him to resign in 1316.

Brabazon married Beatrice, daughter of Warin of Bassingbourn, at some point between 1281 and 1284. With his own and his wife's inheritance, combined with later acquisitions, he held extensive lands in the county of Leicestershire. He died on either 13 June or 14 June 1317, and as he left no issue, his heir was his brother, Matthew. He was buried in St Paul's Cathedral, and his London house was sold to Hervey de Stanton, later a Chief Justice of the King's Bench himself.

Legal offices
Preceded by Gilbert de Thornton	Lord Chief Justice; 1296–1316	Succeeded by William Inge
