= John de Lovetot =

Justice of the Common Pleas

Sir John de Lovetot (b. 1236 or before, d. 1294) was an administrator and later Justice of the Common Pleas between 1275 and 1289. He had already been knighted when he entered the service of Edward I. Prior to that he had performed administrative duties in Yorkshire, in Norfolk (as sub-sheriff and then as steward of Norwich Cathedral) and with the Earl of Oxford, Robert de Vere.

During his appointment as justice, he also represented the king on diplomatic missions abroad. His legal career ended in 1290 when, along with two other Justices of the King's Bench, he was heavily fined and committed to the Tower of London because of his complicity in the falsification of court records by the Chief Justice Thomas Weyland while the king was away in France. He was placed in the Tower yet again in 1293 while in service to Eleanor, the queen. Eight years after his death, his son John unsuccessfully entered into three-year-long legal proceedings against Walter Langton, Bishop of Coventry, accusing him of arranging the murder of his father and committing adultery with his stepmother Joan, Lovelot's second wife.
