= Martin of Littlebury =

British clerk and justice

Sir Martin of Littlebury

11th Lord Chief Justice of England
- In office 1273–1274
- Monarch: Henry III
- Preceded by: Richard of Staines
- Succeeded by: Ralph de Hengham

12th Chief Justice of the Common Pleas
- In office 1267–1272
- Monarch: Henry III
- Preceded by: Sir Gilbert of Preston
- Succeeded by: Sir Gilbert of Preston

Personal details
- Born: Unknown
- Died: 1274

Sir Martin of Littlebury (died 1274) was a British clerk and justice. He was first recorded in 1242 working as a King's clerk, although it is assumed that he had been previously working for the government as he was, in 1242, awarded the Moiety of a church in Blackburn, and also given a papal indulgence in February 1245. He was most likely a clerk in service to one of the King's justices, but there is also the possibility that he worked for the clerk of Chancery. Before 1245 he was presented to the parish church at Kirkoswald by Thomas of Moulton, either the Thomas of Moulton who served as a royal justice or his son of the same name. In 1250 he was made Canon of Salisbury Cathedral by William of York, another royal justice.

In the late 1240s, Martin served as an occasional Assize Justice, but did not begin full service as a royal justice until the 1260s. In the first half of 1261, he served as a junior justice on three Eyres led by Gilbert of Preston, and became a senior justice on his own Eyre circuit when Eyres resumed in 1262. His final Eyre was in 1263 in Lincolnshire, although the circuit was never completed due to the outbreak of the Second Barons' War. He did not serve during the 1264 reign of Simon de Montford, the "uncrowned King of England", and was not returned to the bench until 1267, when he was appointed Chief Justice of the Common Pleas. According to the official record, he was a voice of moderation after the defeat of de Montford at the 1265 Battle of Evesham, calling for provisions to be made for the widows of those who had died and for the wives of noblemen who had survived but been disinherited.

He served as Chief Justice of the Common Pleas until 1272, when on the death of Henry III he was appointed as the Lord Chief Justice, serving less than two years before dying in June 1274. Robert de Littlebury, Keeper of the Rolls and later a judge in Ireland, was a cousin.

Legal offices
Preceded by Richard of Staines	Lord Chief Justice; 1272–1274	Succeeded by Ralph de Hengham
Preceded by Sir Gilbert of Preston	Chief Justice of the Common Pleas; 1268–1272	Succeeded by Sir Gilbert of Preston
