= John Vavasour =

Sir John Vavasour KS (c. 1440 – 26 November 1506) was an English judge. He was apparently part of a minor regional knightly family, and studied law at Inner Temple. He was made a Serjeant-at-Law in 1478 and appointed a King's Serjeant in 1483, followed by a 1485 appointment as Second Justice of Lancaster and a 1495 promotion there to Chief Justice.

He had also served as Recorder of York from 1486 until his appointment as Fourth Justice of the Court of Common Pleas on 17 October 1489. He was promoted to Third Justice in 1494 and served as such until 1504. He was knighted in 1501 and discharged as a judge on 16 October 1506, dying shortly after on 26 November.

Legal offices
Vacant	Fourth Justice of the Common Pleas; 1489–1494	Succeeded by John Fineux
Preceded by William Danvers	Third Justice of the Common Pleas; 1494–1504	Succeeded by John Fyssher
