= Anne Eyre =

- Born: 1612 or 1613
- Died: 1681 (aged 68–69)
- Occupation: Account keeper
- Known for: Record keeping
- Children: Four

Anne Eyre, born Anne Aldersey (1612 of 1613–1681), was an English account keeper whose accounts reveal the detail of middle class life before the English Civil War.

== Life ==
She was baptised in 1612 or 1613 as the daughter of Samuel Aldersey, of Aldersey in Cheshire. She married Robert Eyre who came of a legal family, his grandfather, Robert, having been a bencher and reader of Lincoln's Inn, and his father being a barrister, Robert Eyre of Salisbury and Chilhampton.

Her husband started an accounts book in 1638, the same year as the birth of their son Samuel. Anne soon took over the accounting and her detailed records provide an insight into 17th-century households up to the English Civil War.

Samuel went on to become a judge and was appointed to the King's Bench.
