= John Bosanquet =

British judge (1773–1847)

The Right Honourable Sir John Bosanquet
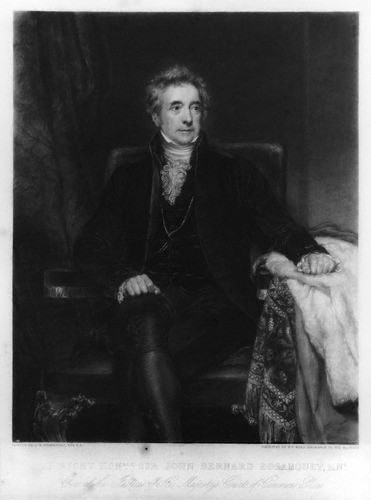

Third Justice of the Common Pleas
- In office 1830–1842
- Preceded by: James Burrough

Personal details
- Born: 2 May 1773
- Died: 25 September 1847 (aged 74)
- Parent: Samuel Bosanquet (father)

Sir John Bernard Bosanquet KS PC (2 May 1773 – 25 September 1847) was a British judge.

== Life ==
He was born to Samuel Bosanquet, the governor of the Bank of England, and his wife Eleanor, and was educated at Eton College before being accepted into Christ Church, Oxford. He gained his BA on 9 June 1795 and his MA on 20 March 1800. He became a member of Lincoln's Inn on 22 January 1794 and was called to the bar on 9 May 1800, joining the home circuit.

He also attended the Essex sessions, of which his father was chairman. Before his call he had, with Christopher Puller, started the Reports of Cases argued and determined in the Court of Common Pleas and Exchequer Chamber, and in the House of Lords. Of these reports there are two series, the first in three volumes from 1790 to 1804, and the second in two volumes from 1804 to 1807.

Owing to family influence his career at the bar was soon a successful one. He became general counsel to the East India Company in 1814, and the Bank of England in 1819.

He was made a Serjeant-at-Law on 22 November 1814, and from that time came prominently before the public in the numerous bank prosecutions which he conducted with great discretion for thirteen years. He turned down the position of Chief Justice of Bengal in 1824 and was made a King's Serjeant in 1827.

On 16 May 1828 he was nominated one of the commissioners appointed to inquire into the practice of the common law courts. Over this commission he presided for three years. After the retirement of James Burrough he became Third Justice of the Court of Common Pleas on 1 February 1830, and was knighted the next day.

He became a member of the Privy Council on 4 September 1833, and sat on the Judicial Committee regularly until 1840. Upon the resignation of John Copley, 1st Baron Lyndhurst, Bosanquet in conjunction with Charles Pepys, 1st Earl of Cottenham, the master of the rolls, and Sir Lancelot Shadwell, the vice-chancellor, was appointed a lord commissioner of the great seal. This commission lasted from 23 April 1835 to 16 Jan. 1836, when Pepys was made lord chancellor.

He retired from the Common Pleas in 1842 due to ill-health, and died on 25 September 1847 at Firs, Hampstead Heath. He was buried at Llantillio-Crossenny, Monmouthshire.

== Sources ==
- Barker, G. F. R. (2004). "Oxford DNB article:Bosanquet, Sir John Bernard". In Mooney, Hugh (ed.). Oxford Dictionary of National Biography (online ed.). Oxford University Press. doi:10.1093/ref:odnb/2929. (Subscription, Wikipedia Library access or UK public library membership required.)

Legal offices
Preceded by James Burrough	Third Justice of the Common Pleas; 1830–1842	Succeeded by Cresswell Cresswell
