= Samuel Eyre =

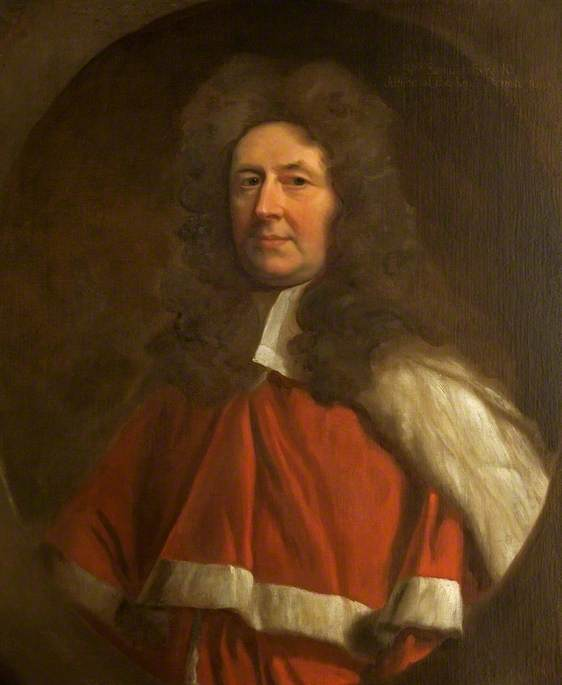
Sir Samuel Eyre by John Riley

Sir Samuel Eyre (1633 – 12 September 1698) was an English judge.

== Life ==
Eyre came of a legal family, his grandfather, Robert, having been a bencher and reader of Lincoln's Inn, and his father being a barrister, Robert Eyre of Salisbury and Chilhampton, who married Anne, daughter of Samuel Aldersey of Aldersey in Cheshire. He was baptised on 16 March 1638. This was the same year as his father started an accounts book; his mother soon took over the accounting and her detailed records are still available, providing an insight into 17th-century households in the period up to the English Civil War.

Samuel was educated at Wadham College, Oxford, matriculating on 9 December 1653. The June after Eyre left Wadham, he was admitted to Lincoln's Inn. In 1660, his mother wrote to him, telling him to think deeply about his marriage plans, advising "when done, not to be undone, and done either happy or unhappy". After studying for seven years, he was called to the bar at Lincoln's Inn in June 1661, becoming a qualified barrister. That October he married Martha Lucy. His wife brought him considerable property.

Under the patronage of the Earl of Shaftesbury, whose adviser he was, he attained some professional eminence. He was made a serjeant on 21 April 1692, and succeeded Justice Dolben on the King's Bench on 6 February 1694, although was not sworn in until 22 February. Eyre was knighted as a result of being promoted to the Bench. When Charles Knollys' claim to the earldom of Banbury came before the House of Lords in 1698, Eyre was called on, along with Chief Justice Holt, to state to the house the grounds upon which he had given judgement in favour of Knollys, who being tried in the King's Bench in 1694 for murder had pleaded his privilege as a peer. This the two judges refused to do, the matter not coming before the house on writ of error from the King's Bench. They were threatened with committal to the Tower, but the matter was dropped.

Eyre died on circuit at Lancaster of an attack of colic on 12 September 1698. A monument was erected at Lancaster to him, and his body was removed to St. Thomas's, Salisbury, the family burial-place, on 2 July 1699. He and Martha had six children; the eldest son, Sir Robert Eyre, was judge of the queen's bench.
