= James Burrough (judge) =

Sir James Burrough (August 1749 – 25 March 1837) was a British judge.

== Life ==
He was the son of Rev. John Burrough and his wife Alexis Blissett, and showed an early interest in the law. He was accepted into Inner Temple in February 1768 and after practising as a Special Pleader he joined the bar in 1773. He became a noted barrister and was on several occasions relied on by the Lord Chancellor for advice. He was made a commissioner of bankrupts in 1792 and appointed deputy recorder of Salisbury in 1794. He was elected a Bencher of Inner Temple in 1808.

In May 1816 he was made Third Justice of the Court of Common Pleas and knighted. During his time on the bench he was noted for his use of common sense in judgements and his use of common language in his decisions and comments. He retired in January 1830 after his health failed him and he suffered several seizures in court. He died on 25 March 1837.

Legal offices
Preceded by Charles Abbott	Third Justice of the Common Pleas; 1816–1830	Succeeded by John Bosanquet
