= Robert Eyre =

English lawyer and Whig politician (1666–1735)

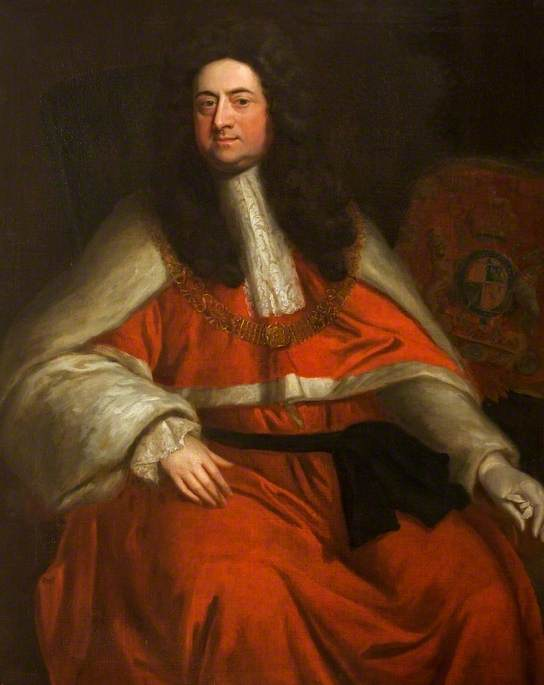
Sir Robert Eyre

Sir Robert Eyre PC (1666 – 28 December 1735) was an English lawyer and Whig politician who sat in the English and British House of Commons from 1698 to 1710. He served as Solicitor-General and then as a judge, and ultimately as Chief Justice of the Common Pleas.

== Early life ==
Eyre was the eldest son of Sir Samuel Eyre of New House, Whiteparish, Wiltshire and his wife Martha Lucy, daughter of Francis Lucy of Westminster and Brightwalton, Berkshire. He was educated at the City Grammar School, Salisbury, was admitted at Lincoln's Inn on 2 April 1683, and matriculated at Lincoln College, Oxford on 11 May 1683. In 1690, he was called to the bar. He married Elizabeth Rudge, daughter of Edward Rudge, MP, with £4,000, on 6 December 1694. He succeeded his father in 1698.

== Career ==
Eyre became deputy recorder of Salisbury in 1693 and became Recorder in 1695 for the rest of his life. At the 1698 English general election, he was returned as Member of Parliament for Salisbury. He was nominally a Whig, but had a tendency to independence, particularly to make trouble. He was returned again at the two general elections of 1701 and at the 1702 English general election. He became Recorder of Southampton in 1703, serving until 1723, and recorder and alderman of Bristol in 1704, serving until 1728. He was returned again as MP for Salisbury at the 1705 English general election. In 1707 he became a QC and bencher of his Inn.

Eyre was returned to Parliament again at the 1708 British general election and was appointed Solicitor-General from 1708 to 1710. He became Treasurer of his Inn in 1709. He was particularly active at this time in relation to the impeachment of Dr Sacheverell. In 1710, he was appointed a puisne judge of the Court of Queen's Bench, and was knighted on 6 May 1710. He did not stand for Parliament again. In 1718, he gave an opinion favouring the view of the Prince of Wales, rather than that of the king over the education of the prince's children, and was therefore passed over for promotion to be Lord Chief Justice of King's Bench. However, he was appointed Lord Chief Baron of the Exchequer in 1723 and then appointed as Chief Justice of the Common Pleas in 1725, a post in which he served until his death. He was a governor of Charterhouse by 1723.

Eyre's wife Elizabeth died in 1724. He died at his house in Bloomsbury Square, Central London on 28 December 1735. He and his wife had three sons and a daughter. He was succeeded by his son Robert.

Legal offices
Preceded by Sir James Montagu	Solicitor General for England and Wales; 1708–1710	Succeeded by Sir Robert Raymond
Preceded by Sir James Montagu	Lord Chief Baron of the Exchequer; 1723–1725	Succeeded by Sir Jeffrey Gilbert
Preceded by Peter King	Chief Justice of the Common Pleas; 1725–1735	Succeeded by Sir Thomas Reeve
Parliament of England
Preceded by Thomas Hoby; Sir Thomas Mompesson	Member of Parliament for Salisbury; 1698–1707; With: Charles Fox 1698–1701, 1701–1707; Sir Thomas Mompesson 1701	Succeeded by Parliament of Great Britain
Parliament of Great Britain
Preceded by Parliament of England	Member of Parliament for Salisbury; 1707–1710; With: Charles Fox 1707–1710	Succeeded by Charles Fox; Robert Pitt
