= Robert Bealknap =

English judge (died 1401)

Sir Robert Belknap (died 19 January 1401) was a senior English judge.

== Origins ==
Born about or before 1330, possibly in Kent or Wiltshire, England, he was the son of John Belknap, a lawyer, and his wife Alice.

== Career ==
He is first mentioned in June 1351 in a papal register of indults issued to inhabitants of England, where he is called a "clerk, of the diocese of Salisbury" in Wiltshire. He next appears in 1353 as a member of a commission to survey Battle Abbey. This commission was followed by an extensive number of others, as evidenced by extant patent rolls, until 1388, most of which related to oyer and terminer, walliis et fossatis, gaol delivery, sewers, and the peace primarily, but not exclusively, in Kent and other parts of southeastern England. He was appointed a Justice of the Peace for Kent on 18 May 1362, and at the same time began serving as legal counsel. In July 1362 he served on a commission with William of Wykeham investigating lands granted to the Bishopric of Winchester, which Wykeham at that time held. From this point Belknap's career as a lawyer began to prosper; from 1371 he was retained as a lawyer by Westminster Abbey, and from 1374 by John of Gaunt. He was sent along with John Wycliffe and John Gilbert to Bruges in July 1374 to negotiate papal provisions; he returned in September and on 10 October he was made Chief Justice of the Common Pleas, and was knighted on 28 December of that same year. From 1375 to 1388 he served as a Trier of Petitions in Parliament, and in 1376 he was involved in investigating Richard Lyons in Essex and Sussex after complaints of embezzlement.

Following the death of Edward III he was reappointed as Chief Justice under Richard II but was widely unpopular; at the time of the Peasants' Revolt he was in Essex conducting a court of trailbaston and was forced to promise not to conduct such courts again, as well as physically attacked. When the rebels reached London he was one of 15 people whose deaths they demanded. He also offended the people of London itself by suggesting that their claim to the position of Chief Butler of England for Richard's coronation should be rejected; in response they placed a model of his head on a water fountain in the marketplace so that it would vomit wine when Richard walked by.

Belknap's downfall began when he advised the commission created in Parliament on 19 November 1386 to reform the government. The king and his advisers saw this commission as infringing on royal authority, and on 25 August 1387 Belknap and the other justices involved were summoned to Nottingham and asked whether such a commission was lawful and, if not, how the summoners should be punished. The justices responded that such a commission was unlawful, and that the summoners should be punished as traitors. Belknap reportedly refused to seal the answers until threatened with death by Robert de Vere, Duke of Ireland, and Michael de la Pole.

In response to this the Lords Appellant seized power on 17 November. After the Merciless Parliament began on 30 January 1388 Robert Charleton was made Chief Justice of the Common Pleas, and Belknap was arrested along with his fellow justices. The group were brought to trial on 27 February due to their answers in relation to the legality of the parliamentary commission, and were sentenced to death. After many high-ranking figures including William Courtenay and Queen Anne pleaded on their behalf, the sentence was changed to that of forfeiture and attainder, including exile to Drogheda, Ireland.

At the time of his attainder, Belknap held extensive manorial properties in Kent (Beachborough Manor, Orpington, Seintling or Saint Mary Cray, Bybrook Manor, Westcombe Manor, Kingsnoth, among others), Sussex (Knelle Manor, Wilting Manor), Hampshire (Crux Easton, Penton Mewsey), Hertfordshire (Rushden, La More Manor), Cambridgeshire (Gamlingay, Caldecote, Norfolk (Salthouse), Bedfordshire (Little Holwell), and Oxfordshire (Hoo Manor). The attainder and exile were revoked in the January 1397 parliament. Some of Belknap's land holdings were returned to him or members of his immediate family with the first parliament of Henry IV in October 1399, although his wife Juliana in a noted case was allowed to bring suit as feme sole for certain lands. Belknap died less than two years later on 19 January 1401, and was buried in Rochester Cathedral.

== Family ==
He was married twice, first to Amy (last name possibly Say), who died before 1373, and second to Juliana Darset (died 1414), daughter of John Darset and Elizabeth Phelipp, daughter of Thomas Phelipp of Baldock, Hertfordshire. All of his five known children were presumably with Juliana:

- Thomas Belknap (died before 1414)
- John Belknap
- Joan Belknap (died before 1419), married (1) Ralph Stonor (died 13 November 1394 accompanying King Richard II of England while en route to Ireland) and (2) Sir Edmund Hampden (died before 29 April 1420), Sheriff and Escheator of Bedfordshire and Buckinghamshire.
- Sir Hamon Belknap (died before 18 March 1429), Treasurer of Normandy, married Joan Boteler, daughter of Thomas Boteler, 4th Baron Sudeley.
- Juliana Belknap (died after 1417), married (1) Robert Avenel and (2) Nicholas Kymbell

Robert Belknap is the great-grandfather of Sir Edward Belknap, Privy Councillor to Henry VII and Henry VIII, through Sir Hamon Belknap's son Sir Henry Belknap (died 20 June 1488).

== See also ==
- Belnap Family Organization

Legal offices
Preceded by Sir William Fyncheden	Chief Justice of the Common Pleas; 1374–1388	Succeeded by Robert Charleton
