= Robert Charleton (judge) =

English Chief Justice of the Common Pleas and member of several parliaments

Sir Robert Charleton SL JP (died 1395/6) was an English Chief Justice of the Common Pleas and a member of several parliaments.

== Biography ==
Charleton is first recorded in July 1375, when he was made a commissioner of the peace for Wiltshire and Somerset; from here on his appointments were spread over much of England, including a September 1377 investigation in Wiltshire examining men who claimed to be exempt from work under the Domesday Book, one of three investigations created as a response to the surge of peasant unrest in Wiltshire, Devon and Surrey due to the 'great rumour'. When the Peasants' Revolt broke out in 1381 Charleton was one of the justices tasked in June 1381 of punishing rebels in Wiltshire and Gloucestershire, and was appointed to a similar commission in March 1382, this time just for Gloucestershire, tasked with punishing rebels and also breaking up large gatherings of peasants with the county militia.

In January 1383 he was appointed a Serjeant-at-law, and from this point served regularly on commissions of Assize and gaol delivery, continuing to be appointed to commissions of the peace and similar in Wiltshire, Gloucestershire and Shropshire. In November 1385 he was appointed a Justice of the Peace for Herefordshire, Oxfordshire, Bristol and Wiltshire, and in August 1386 he served on a commission of the peace in Staffordshire, as well as another one in June 1384 investigating the state of embankments in the Thames Valley. On 30 January 1388 Charleton was made Chief Justice of the Common Pleas; a remarkable achievement considering he had no previous experience in the Court of Common Pleas.

Charleton is not known to have been close to the Lords Appellant, who at that point controlled the government, but he was apparently close to William of Wykeham, which is the most likely explanation for his unexpected promotion. Charleton managed to stay relatively safe in the difficult early half of 1388; despite, due to his position, being involved in the Merciless Parliament which executed most of Richard II's court and senior advisers, but when Richard reasserted his authority in May 1389 Charleton was made a Knight banneret.

Charleton attended at least seven of the eight Parliaments between February 1388 and January 1395, with the records for that in September 1388 not surviving, and on each occasion served as a Trier of Petitions. He served actively as Chief Justice until Michaelmas 1395, dying some time between 12 November 1395 and 15 January 1396, when his successor as Chief Justice was appointed.

== Notes ==
Legal offices
Preceded by Sir Robert Belknap	Chief Justice of the Common Pleas; 1388–1395	Succeeded by William Thirning
