= Ralph Sandwich =

English administrator and justice

Sir Ralph Sandwich (1235–1308) (also known as Rauf de Sanduiz, Ralph de Sandwich and Ralph of Sandwich), of Dene (in Margate), Ham, and Ripple, Kent, Winchfield, Hampshire, etc., was an English administrator and justice. He was Steward of the King's Demesne, Constable of Canterbury (1278), and Royal Warden (Lord Mayor) of London (1286, 1288–1293).

== Biography ==
He was the son of Simon of Sandwich, the brother of clergyman Henry of Sandwich, and Gillian Sandwich. His family had close connections with Simon de Montfort, and his uncle's links with Montfort's administration is most likely what brought Ralph into government. By September 1264 he had become part of the captive King's household, and on 1 January 1265 he became Master of the Great Wardrobe. On 7 May he was made Keeper of the Great Seal, although without the governmental position which accompanied it. He was only allowed to use it for routine writs, otherwise the presence of Peter de Montfort and two others was required.

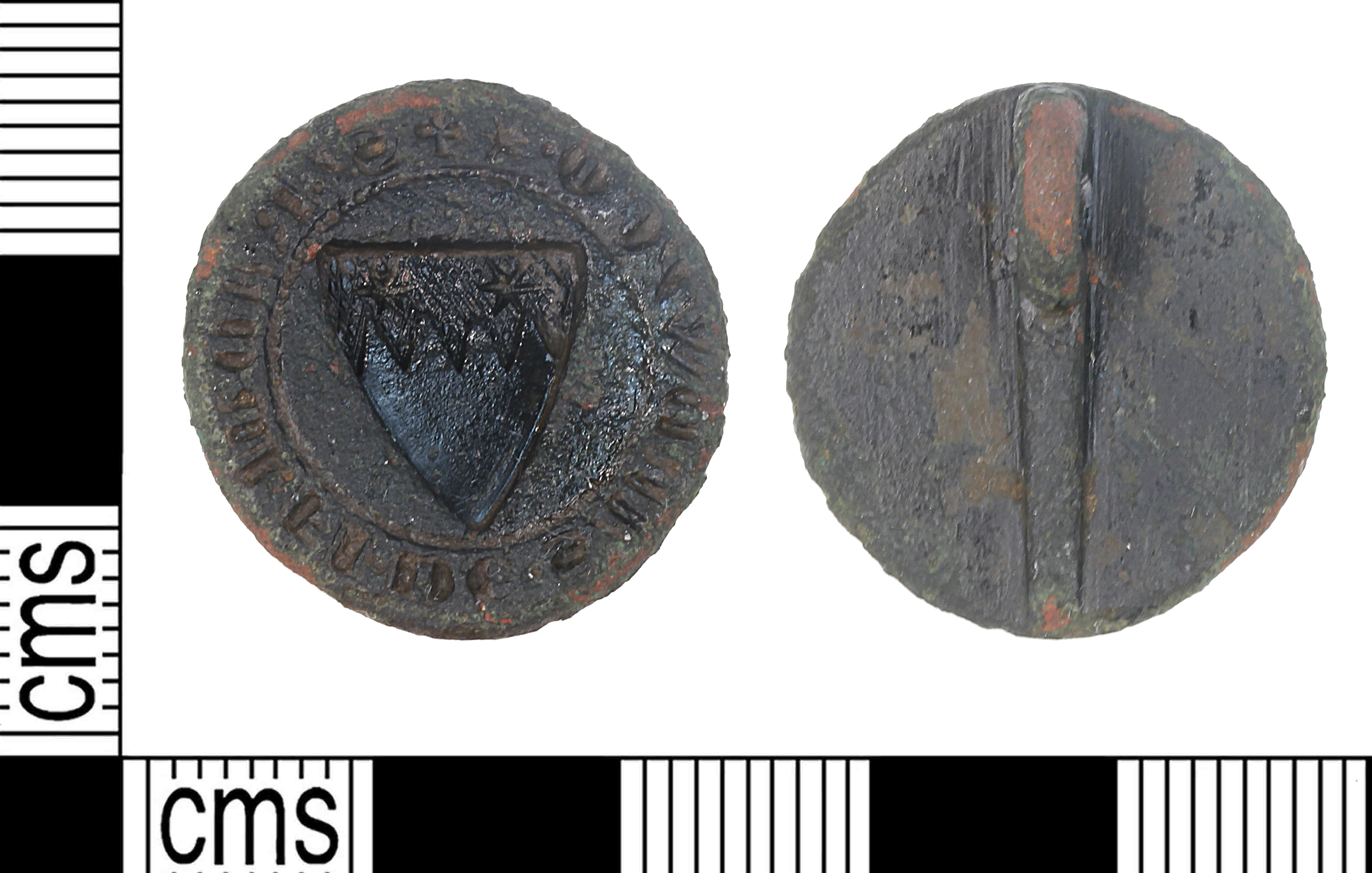
A seal matrix of 13th century type attributed to Ralph of Sandwich and found near the family's estate at Preston Manor. Inscription reads '+S'RADULFI.DE.SANDWICO', around shield of arms 'Argent on a chief murrey indented two mullet'. Recorded with the Portable antiquities scheme as KENT-3C5592 and now in Sandwich Guildhall Museum.

On 4 August 1265, Sandwich was captured at the Battle of Evesham fighting on the losing side for de Montfort. His lands were confiscated and given to Roger de Leybourne and his father's lands awarded to Leybourne's son William, who also married Juliana de Sandwich (1245-1327) on 16 October 1265; she was the daughter of Sir Henry de Sandwich (died c. 1249). After his pardon in 1266, Sandwich maintained a relationship with the Leybourne family, acting as a lawyer to Roger's widow in 1272 and executing her will in 1276. After the death of his uncle Henry of Sandwich in 1273, he was made administrator of the See of London, having already acted as their administrator during Henry's exile in Rome. In November 1273 he was appointed to audit the accounts of the Constable of Dover Castle, and in 1274 was summoned to attend the coronation of Edward I. In November 1275 he was one of three men appointed as a Steward of the King's Demesne, with his responsibilities being the counties of the south and west. The post, which involved large amounts of travel, handling of huge sums of money (over £7000 between 1277 and 1279) and the supervision of large building works at Devizes, Banstead, and Odiham, completely exhausted one of his colleagues.

He also acted as Keeper of the Port of Dover, Keeper of the Forest of Dean and administrator of the See of Canterbury during the 1278–1279 vacancy. In 1280 he was appointed to negotiate for the site of New Winchelsea. A member of the King's council, Sandwich was in 1278 appointed justice coram rege (in the presence of the King) for when the king was in Kent, and was with the judges when Alexander III of Scotland paid homage in Westminster in October. In 1285 Edward took direct control of London, appointing Sandwich as Warden of London on 1 July and Constable of the Tower on 10 September. Until 1293 Sandwich was the effective Mayor of London, and presided over the city's Court of Hustings. He was appointed Chief Justice of the Court of Common Pleas in 1289 after the previous holder, Sir Thomas Weyland, became a fugitive 'until the king makes further provision', and stepped down in 1290 after a replacement was found. Between 1286 and 1307 he sat every year as a justice at the original Old Bailey, and sat as a justice at the trial of William Wallace at Westminster Hall in 1305.

He attended Edward II's coronation in February 1308, and on 24 March turned the custody of the Tower of London over to John Cromwell. He died before 20 August and was buried in Greyfriars Church. In 1309 Henry de Eynesford, Nicholas de Sandwich, Thomas de Boynton, and William de Berton, clerk, executors of the will of Ralph de Sandwich, deceased were summoned to answer William de Carleton, Baron of the Exchequer, and his associates, executors of the will of William, Bishop of Norwich, deceased regarding a debt of £40. By an unknown first wife, he appears to have had a daughter, Desirée (or Desiderata) (living 1330–1), wife of Geoffrey de Lucy, Knt. He married (2nd) Maud, widow of Thomas de Belhouse, who survived him.

Court offices
Preceded by Henry of Ghent	Master of the Great Wardrobe; 1265–1265	Succeeded by Nicholas of Lewknor
Political offices
Preceded by Thomas de Cantilupe	Keeper of the Great Seal; 1265–1265	Succeeded by Walter Giffard
Legal offices
Preceded by Sir Thomas Weyland	Chief Justice of the Common Pleas; 1289–1290	Succeeded by John of Mettingham
Honorary titles
Preceded by Ralph de Dacre	Constable of the Tower; 1285–1308	Succeeded by John de Cromwell, 1st Baron Cromwell
Civic offices
Preceded by Gregory de Rokesley	Mayor of London; 1285–1293	Succeeded by John le Breton
