= William Fyncheden =

British justice

Sir William Fyncheden KS (died 1374) was an English justice. He was first recorded as a lawyer in 1350, and the same year was made a Commissioner of embankments in Yorkshire. From then on he was a regular appointee to commissions of Oyer and terminer, mostly in Yorkshire but also in Derbyshire, Nottinghamshire and Lincolnshire; he was also appointed as a Justice of Labourers several times in both Yorkshire and Nottinghamshire.

In February 1355, he was appointed to investigate unauthorised Alienation of royal lands in 6 counties, including Nottinghamshire and Derbyshire. In 1359, he investigated trespasses against the royal family and their tenants in Richmondshire, and in 1360 he was tasked with the inquiry as to whether the lands of Roger Mortimer were being held by the King or as part of Wales, to which he found the latter. In 1362, he was made a King's Serjeant. Around 1365, he inherited substantial lands, mostly in Yorkshire, from Sir William de Notton, Lord Chief Justice of Ireland, who was presumably his cousin.

His career continued to develop in the 1360s, with commissions of Oyer and terminer in Sussex, Huntingdonshire, Cambridgeshire, Kent and Gloucestershire. In 1365 he was made a Justice of the Common Pleas and knighted. He attended Parliament in 1366 as a Trier of petitions, a position he maintained at the Parliaments of 1368, 1369, 1371 and 1373, and at the same time he also acted as an Assize justice, mainly in the Home counties and West Midlands.

On 14 April 1371, he was appointed Chief Justice of the Common Pleas after the previous holder was made Lord Chancellor; Fyncheden then died in 1374 after a relatively brief tenure as Chief Justice.

Legal offices
Preceded by Sir Robert Thorpe	Chief Justice of the Common Pleas; 1372–1374	Succeeded by Sir Robert Belknap
