= Robert Thorpe (Lord Chancellor) =

British justice

Sir Robert Thorpe KS JP (died 29 June 1372) was a British justice. He was the son of another Sir Robert Thorpe, and is occasionally confused with another Robert Thorpe who was second master of Pembroke College, Cambridge at around the same time. The Thorpe family produced many prominent lawyers, including William de Thorpe, Chief Justice of the King's Bench, who may have been influential in guiding Robert towards a judicial career. In 1339 he was made a Serjeant-at-law, and between 1345 and 1356 served as a King's Serjeant. He served as a Justice of the Peace in Cambridgeshire, Huntingdonshire, Norfolk, Suffolk, Bedfordshire and Buckinghamshire, and was also involved in Assize, Gaol delivery and Oyer and terminer. On 27 June 1356 he was appointed as Chief Justice of the Common Pleas and knighted, and on 1 October he was awarded a grant of £40 to support his new position (£33,784 in 2023). He was a member of the councils of both the Black Prince and John of Gaunt, and was appointed a Trier of Petitions at every Parliament between 1362 and 1371.

In 1368 he took part in the trial of the Steward of the King's Household, Sir John de la Lee, and in 1371 he was part of a commission inquiring into the embezzlement of money by Sir William Latimer. An anti-clerical movement in 1371 forced the King to dismiss the Lord Chancellor, treasurer, and keeper of the privy seal and replace them with laymen; as a result, Thorpe was appointed as Chancellor to replace William of Wykeham, a position he took up on 14 April. He held the position for only a year until his death on 29 June 1372.

== Notes ==
Legal offices
Preceded by Sir Roger Hillary	Chief Justice of the Common Pleas; 1356–1371	Succeeded by Sir William Fyncheden
Political offices
Preceded by William of Wykeham	Lord Chancellor; 1371–1372	Succeeded by Sir John Knyvet
