= Richard Norton (justice) =

English justice

His Worship Richard Norton KS JP (died 1420) was an English justice.

He was the son of Adam Conyers, who changed his name to Adam Norton when he married the heiress of Norton-on-Derwent in Yorkshire. Norton is first mentioned as an Advocate in 1399, and was created a Serjeant-at-law in 1401. On 4 June 1405 he was appointed to the trial of those involved in Richard le Scrope's rebellion, but was removed from the commission on 6 June. He served in 1406 as an Assize justice for the Palatinate of Durham, and in the same year was made a King's Serjeant. He was appointed as a justice for the Court of Common Pleas by Henry V on 23 May 1413, and Chief Justice a month later on 26 of June, becoming Chief justice of the Palatinate of Lancaster at around the same time. Between November 1414 and December 1420 he also appeared as a regular Trier of Petitions in Parliament.

Norton served on many government commissions under Henry IV and Henry V, most notably as a commissioner of Oyer and terminer in Durham, Yorkshire, Norfolk, Suffolk and Devon, and as an officer tasked with hunting down escaped criminals in Northumberland, Yorkshire, Norfolk and Suffolk. After his investigation into Richard le Scrope he was tasked with a similar commission into the lands of Henry Percy in 1407. He also served as a justice of the peace from 1399 onwards, initially for the North Riding of Yorkshire but later for other areas. He died on 20 December 1420, and was buried in Wath, Yorkshire.

Norton married Elizabeth, daughter of Sir John Tempest of Studley, by whom he had several sons, the pedigree of whose descendants is given in Surtees's ‘History of Durham,’ vol. i. p. clx–clxi.

Legal offices
Preceded by William Thirning	Chief Justice of the Common Pleas; 1413–1420	Succeeded by Sir William Babington
