= Henry le Scrope =

English lawyer and Chief Justice of the King's Bench

Sir Henry le Scrope

16th Lord Chief Justice of England
- In office 15 June 1317 – September 1323
- Monarch: Edward II
- Prime Minister: Thomas, Earl of Lancaster (1317-1322) (as Lord High Steward)
- Chancellor: John Sandale (1317-1318); John Hotham (1318-1320); John Salmon (1320-1323)
- Preceded by: William Inge
- Succeeded by: Hervey de Stanton

20th Lord Chief Justice of England
- In office 28 October 1329 – 19 December 1330
- Monarch: Edward III
- Prime Minister: Henry, 3rd Earl of Lancaster (as Lord High Steward)
- Chancellor: Henry Burghersh (1329-1330); John de Stratford (1330)
- Preceded by: Robert de Malthorp
- Succeeded by: Geoffrey le Scrope

24th Chief Justice of the Common Pleas
- In office 1333–1333
- Monarch: Edward III
- Prime Minister: Henry, 3rd Earl of Lancaster (as Lord High Steward)
- Chancellor: John de Stratford
- Preceded by: William Herle
- Succeeded by: William Herle

Personal details
- Born: c. 1269
- Died: 7 September 1336 (aged 66–67)
- Resting place: St Agatha's Abbey, Easby
- Spouse: Margaret le Scrope
- Relations: Geoffrey le Scrope (younger brother)
- Children: William le Scrope; Stephen le Scrope; Richard le Scrope
- Parent: Sir William le Scrope

Sir Henry le Scrope (b. in or before 1268 – 7 September 1336) was an English lawyer, and Chief Justice of the King's Bench for two periods between 1317 and 1330. He was the eldest son of Sir William le Scrope (c. 1259 – c. 1312), who was bailiff to the earl of Richmond in Richmondshire. Henry's younger brother Geoffrey was also a lawyer who probably advanced through the influence of his older brother. Geoffrey served as Chief Justice four times between 1324 and 1338.

Henry was an advocate at the King's Bench by 1292, and had various judicial commissions in the years from 1306 to 1308. On 27 November 1308 he was appointed justice of the common pleas. His friendship with, and the work he did for Henry Lacy, earl of Lincoln, helped his advancement at court, where he became a strong supporter of King Edward II. In 1311, after the barons had forced the king to accept the restrictions of the so-called Ordinances, Scrope withdrew from Parliament in protest, but was promptly ordered by the king to return. On 15 June 1317, when the king was once more restored to full power, Scrope was promoted to Chief Justice of the King's Bench. It was during this period (specifically from Hilary term 1319) that he instituted the practice of enrolling cases especially pertaining to the king on separate membranes, what became known as the Rex section.

In 1322 he received a share of the estates forfeited by the adherents of Thomas, earl of Lancaster, after the earl's failed rebellion at Boroughbridge. The next year, however, Scrope was replaced as Chief Justice for reasons that are not quite clear. Still, he did not entirely fall out of favour at court, and on 10 September was appointed justice of the forests north of Trent. He also had the good will of the new regime under Edward III, and on 5 February 1327 was named 'second justice' of the common pleas. From 28 October 1329 to 19 December 1330, while his brother Geoffrey was abroad, he once more took on the post of Chief Justice of the King's Bench. After this he was made Chief Baron of the Exchequer, a post he held until his death.

Henry le Scrope was knighted at some point before February 1311. He held extensive possessions all over England, amounting to twenty-one manors all in all, most of them in Yorkshire. He was married to a Margaret, perhaps the daughter of either Lord Ros or Lord Fitzwalter. Together they had three sons. Margaret outlived him until 1357, and after his death married Sir Hugh Mortimer of Chelmarsh, Shropshire. When Sir Henry died on 7 September 1336, he was buried in the Premonstratensian Easby Abbey of St Agatha at Easby, close to Richmond. Of his three sons, the eldest, William, was a soldier who distinguished himself in the French and Scottish wars, and died in 1344. The next brother, Stephen, had predeceased William, so the estates passed to Richard Scrope, who subsequently became the first Lord Scrope of Bolton, and chancellor of England.

Legal offices
Preceded by William Inge	Lord Chief Justice; 1317–1323	Succeeded by Hervey de Stanton
Preceded by Robert de Malberthorp	Lord Chief Justice; 1329–1330	Succeeded by Geoffrey le Scrope
Preceded by Sir William Herle	Chief Justice of the Common Pleas; 1333	Succeeded by Sir William Herle
Preceded by Sir John Stonor	Chief Baron of the Exchequer; 1334–1336	Succeeded by Sir Robert Sadington
