= Thomas Reeve =

British justice

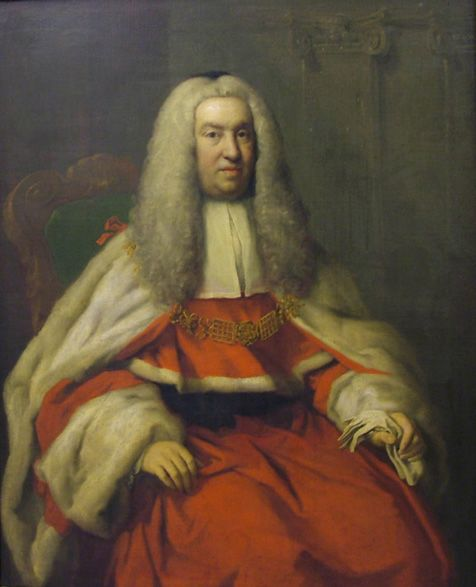
Sir Thomas Reeve, in a portrait by Jacopo Amigoni.

Sir Thomas Reeve, PC (1673 – 19 January 1737) was a British justice.

== Life ==
He was the son of Richard Reeve, and was matriculated to Trinity College, Oxford in 1688 at the age of 15, joining Inner Temple in 1690. In 1698 he was called to the Bar, migrating to Middle Temple in 1713. He was called to the Inn bench in 1720, and served as treasurer in 1728. In 1717 he became a King's counsel, and in 1722 became attorney-general of the Duchy of Lancaster. He was at this point one of the most prolific barristers in Britain. An analysis of records show that in 1720 he was appearing in more cases than any other barrister in the Court of the King's Bench. He was appointed a judge in the King's Bench on 18 November 1723.

On 17 April 1733, he became a Puisne justice of the Court of Common Pleas, and was created a Serjeant-at-law at the same time to satisfy the minimum requirements for the office. After the death of Sir Robert Eyre in office in 1735 Reeve was rumoured to be succeeding him, but had competition in the form of Alexander Denton, who he had previously succeeded as attorney-general of the Duchy of Lancaster; Denton was rejected on grounds of ill-health, however, and Reeve was promoted on 26 January 1736, and knighted at the same time. He was appointed to the Privy Council shortly after. He died in office within a year on 19 January 1737, and was buried in Temple Church on 28 January. He was at the time of his death very wealthy, including over £22,000 in personal property, as well as land in Berkshire and London; he was apparently courted by Lord Sidney Beauclerk, an infamous fortune-seeker, who hoped to be given a legacy, although without success. He was married to Annabella Topham, whose brother Richard Topham was Keeper of the Records at the Tower of London; Beauclerk later succeeded in getting the estate of Richard in and around Windsor and Old Windsor.

The memorial to Sir Thomas and his wife (with busts) stands in John the Baptist Church in Windsor and is by Peter Scheemakers.

Legal offices
Preceded by Sir Robert Eyre	Chief Justice of the Common Pleas; 1736–1737	Succeeded by Sir John Willes
