= John Juyn =

English judge

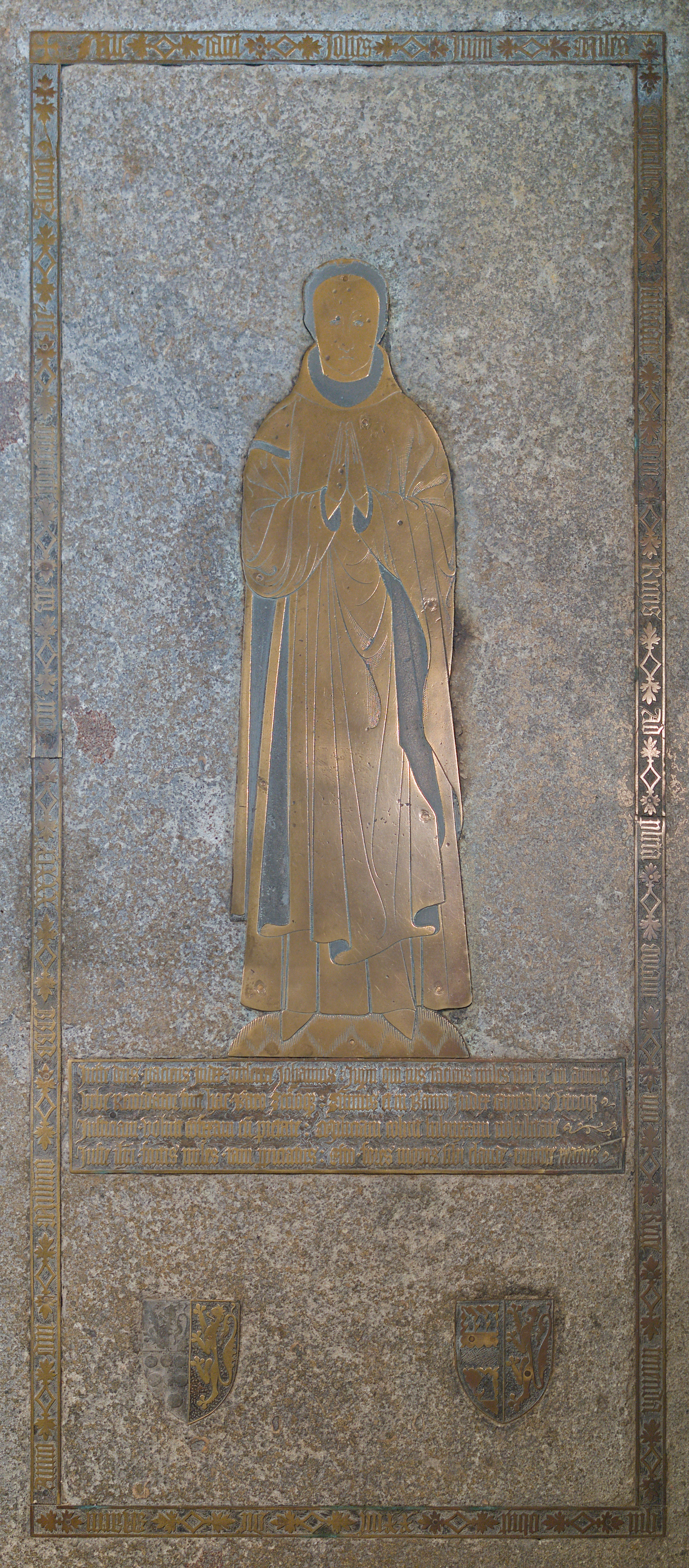
Monumental brass of John Juyn in the Lady chapel of St Mary Redcliffe

Sir John Juyn (died 24 March 1440), SL, was an English judge who served as Chief Justice of the King's Bench (1439–40).

== Origins ==
He was the son of John Juhyne (d. 1390), a wool merchant from Bristol, by his wife, Margery (maiden name unknown).

== Career ==
Following the death of his father in 1390, Juyn inherited his estates in Bristol, Bedminster and Knowle. His father's contacts with the Bristolian merchant community helped with his career; between 1422 and 1438, he served as Recorder of Bristol, and also acted as a feoffee for many of the city's leading merchants. His first appearance in surviving records was in 1407, as a mainpernor for a group of Bristolian merchants sued for debt by the City of London. He was appointed a serjeant-at-law in 1415, but avoided taking-up this position and its financial burden until 1418.

Between 1416 and 1422, he served as legal counsel for the Duchy of Lancaster, settling the matter of the Bohun estate, dividing it between King Henry V and Lady Anne Hastings, and also served as counsel to Thomas of Lancaster, 1st Duke of Clarence between 1418 and 1420.

He travelled the Western circuit as a Justice of Assizes between 1422 and 1424. On 5 May 1423, he was appointed Lord Chief Baron of the Exchequer. In 1436, he received an additional appointment as Justice of the Court of Common Pleas, from which time he switched to the Home Counties circuit.

In May 1426, he was knighted in Parliament, and acted as a trier of petitions there from 1425 to 1439, during which period he was summoned frequently to advise the King's Council, most notably for 15 days at the November 1426 Council at Reading, where he helped to draft laws to keep the peace between Humphrey, Duke of Gloucester and Henry Beaufort. For most of his life he lived in Somerset, in which county he served as a Justice of the Peace on every Peace Commission between 1419 and his death. He raised loans for King Henry IV in the 1420s and 1430s.

On 9 February 1436, he was appointed Chief Justice of the Common Pleas, still retaining his position as Lord Chief Baron of the Exchequer, and on 20 January 1439 he was made Chief Justice of the King's Bench, when finally he quitted his joint positions in the Courts of Exchequer and Common Pleas. He held this position for only a year before becoming ill, and died on 24 March 1440.

== Marriages and children ==
He married twice:

- Firstly to Edith (maiden name unknown), who died childless;
- Secondly to Alis Moore, a daughter of Nicholas de la Moor, of Moor Hayes in the parish of Cullompton, Devon, by whom he had two daughters and co-heiresses:
  - Alis Juyn;
  - Isabel Juyn, who in 1436 married Robert Kenn.

Legal offices
| Preceded by Sir William Babington | Lord Chief Baron of the Exchequer; 1423–1436 | Succeeded by John Fray |
| Preceded by Sir William Babington | Chief Justice of the Common Pleas; 1436–1439 | Succeeded by John Cottesmore |
| Preceded by Sir William Cheyne | Lord Chief Justice; 1439–1440 | Succeeded by Sir John Hody |
