= William Herle =

English justice

Sir William Herle (c. 1270–1347) was an English justice. He was first appointed as an attorney for the Common Bench in 1291, and was appointed as a Serjeant-at-law for the Bench in 1299 and was in regular attendance until 1320. In 1315 he was made a King's Serjeant, and in 1320 replaced John Benstead as a junior justice for the Common Bench, being knighted in the same year. He was absent from the court for three terms in 1321 while sitting as a justice on an Eyre in London with Hervey de Stanton, but otherwise served continuously as a junior justice until he replaced Stanton as Chief Justice in 1327. He left in 1329 to serve on two Eyres in Nottinghamshire and Derbyshire, and returned in 1331. He left again in 1333, although he returned the same year, serving until 1335, making him one of only two Chief Justices of the Common Pleas to be appointed and then leave on three separate occasions; the other, Sir John Stonor, was his replacement on two of those occasions. He lived for another twelve years after retirement, dying in 1347.

== Lord of the Manor ==
William Herle was The Lord of the Manor of Braunstone and overlord of Sir Simon Pakeman of Kirby Muxloe.

== Family ==
Herle had a son, Robert, who died in 1364. He also had a daughter, Margaret, who married Ralph Hastings (c. 1329-1346). Robert, who inherited titles, estates and possessions from his father, left the manor of Kirby to his sister's son, Sir Ralph Hastings when he died in 1364 being the last male of the ancestral line.

Legal offices
Preceded by Hervey de Stanton	Chief Justice of the Common Pleas; 1327–1329	Succeeded by Sir John Stonor
Preceded by Sir John Stonor	Chief Justice of the Common Pleas; 1331–1333	Succeeded by Sir Henry Scrope
Preceded by Sir Henry Scrope	Chief Justice of the Common Pleas; 1333–1335	Succeeded by Sir John Stonor
