= William Inge (judge) =

English lawyer and judge

Sir William Inge
- Arms of William Inge; Vert, a chevron or.

15th Lord Chief Justice of England
- In office 1316–1317
- Monarch: Edward II
- Prime Minister: Thomas, Earl of Lancaster (as Lord High Steward)
- Chancellor: John Sandale
- Preceded by: Roger Brabazon
- Succeeded by: Henry le Scrope

Personal details
- Born: c. 1260 Dunstable, Bedfordshire
- Died: May 1322 (aged 61–62)

Sir William Inge (c. 1260 – May 1322) was an English lawyer, and Chief Justice of the King's Bench from 1316 to 1317. He was born in or near Dunstable, Bedfordshire, the son of Thomas Inge, a minor landowner and administrator. William Inge worked as an attorney at the common bench from 1281 to 1285, and was a serjeant of the king between 1287 and 1293. He was employed as a justice of eyre and of the assize, and became a regular assize justice in 1293. He had been knighted by 1300.

Between 1303 and 1307, Inge served in several of Edward I's campaigns in Scotland. In 1303, he entered into the service of Prince Edward, becoming a close advisor. He served as joint Justiciar of Scotia between 1305 until 1306.

In 1310, Inge was appointed as a commissioner to France by Edward II. He was appointed a justice of the common bench in 1313, and held this post until he was appointed Chief Justice of the King's Bench in 1316, upon the retirement of Roger Brabazon. By this time, however, serious allegations of corruption had been raised against Inge. He was accused and convicted of improper conduct over the purchase of the manor of Woodmansterne in Surrey, which contributed to his dismissal as Chief Justice in June 1317. He retired from public life and died shortly before 10 May 1322.

== Marriages and children ==
Inge was married twice. The first marriage was from 1298 to 1300 to Margery (1277-1310 or 1311), daughter of Henry Grapinel, a landowner of estates in Essex and Sussex. This marriage produced Inge's only surviving child, Joan, who married Eon la Zouche. His second marriage was to Isolda, the widow of Urian de Sancto Petro, from 1311 to 1312.

Legal offices
Preceded by Roger le Brabazon	Lord Chief Justice; 1316–1317	Succeeded by Henry le Scrope
