= William Thirning =

British justice

William Thirning KS (died 1413) was an English justice. He served as a commissioner of the peace in 1377 in Northamptonshire and as a commissioner of Oyer and terminer in Bedfordshire in the same year, as well as a Justice of Assize for Yorkshire, Northumberland, Cumberland and Westmorland in June 1380 before becoming a Serjeant-at-law in 1383. He was made a King's Serjeant in 1388, and a justice of the Court of Common Pleas on 11 April of the same year, becoming Chief Justice on 15 January 1396. Thirning took a leading role in the deposition of Richard II 1399, obtaining his renunciation of the throne on 29 September and announcing it in Parliament the following day, before personally announcing the sentence to Richard on 1 October. He continued to be Chief Justice throughout the reign of Henry IV and was reappointed by Henry V when he took the throne in 1413; he died soon after, as his successor was appointed on 26 June.

Legal offices
Preceded by Sir Robert Charleton	Chief Justice of the Common Pleas; 1396–1413	Succeeded by Richard Norton
