= Roger of Seaton =

English justice

Roger of Seaton (c. 1230–1280) was an English justice.

== Biography ==
He studied canon law at Oxford University, and by 1258 he was a qualified magister, a rarity for British justices of the time; of the sixty or so justices who had served under Richard I only three held such a title, with ninety and eight respectively for those who had served under John of England. By 1260 he was using his knowledge of Canon law as the commissary-general for Walter of Kirkham, the Bishop of Durham, as well as his immediate successor, Robert Stitchill, serving as one of his chancellors and also his executor.

In 1268 he switched from an ecclesiastical career to a judicial one, and was appointed as a justice with the Court of Common Pleas. He left the court in 1271 to lead an Eyre circuit that travelled through south-eastern and eastern England, although the circuit was brought to an end in 1272 by the death of Henry III. After the premature end to the Eyre Roger was reappointed as a justice of the Court of Common Pleas, and became the Chief Justice of that court in 1274 after the death of Gilbert of Preston, serving until 1278. During this period he served as an Assize judge in 1273 and 1274 and the judge of an Eyre circuit in Middlesex in 1274 and again in London and in Bedfordshire in 1276. From late 1272 until October 1274 he served as High Sheriff of Northamptonshire, and gave a speech at the 1275 Parliament explaining the king's need for money.

Soon after his 1278 retirement Roger suffered a stroke, and in 1279 entered the Augustinian house in Thornton. He appointed several executors to pay his debtors and distribute his estate, including Oliver Sutton and Nicholas of Higham. He died soon after, and left his remaining possessions to his brother, Richard of Seaton.

Legal offices
Preceded by Sir Gilbert of Preston	Chief Justice of the Common Pleas; 1274–1278	Succeeded by Sir Thomas Weyland
Honorary titles
Preceded by Unknown	High Sheriff of Northamptonshire; 1272–1274	Succeeded by Unknown
