= Roger Hillary =

English judge

Sir Roger Hillary (died 1356) was an English judge. He was one of five sons of William Hillary and his wife Agnes, a landowning family which held properties in Lincolnshire, Warwickshire, Staffordshire, and Leicestershire, and appear to have been related to Sir William Bereford, the Chief Justice of the Common Pleas; a useful connection for a nascent lawyer. In 1310 Hillary was recorded as a court attorney, and in 1324 he was made a Serjeant-at-law. In the later years of Edward II's reign Hillary kept a low profile. In spring 1320 he married Katherine, and added to his property portfolio the Manor of Fisherwick near Lichfield in 1327 and a life-grant of a mill at Bentley at around the same time.

After Edward's deposition in 1327 his career began to advance; in 1329 he was made Chief Justice of the Irish Court of Common Pleas, which he held for eight years. His position within the Irish judicial system seems to have been in name only; his commissions in England began to dramatically increase. In 1332 he was tasked with investigating Breakers of the Kings Peace in Staffordshire, and in 1335 he investigated the activities of administrators in the West Midlands. He was knighted in 1336, and on 18 March 1337 he became a justice of the English Court of Common Pleas. In August 1338, he was tasked with investigating the fate of the wealth of Edmund FitzAlan, 9th Earl of Arundel, who had been executed in 1326, and in 1340 he worked as a tax assessor and collector in Worcestershire and Gloucestershire. In 1341, he was made Chief Justice of the Common Pleas to replace Sir John Stonor, who had been removed following a purge of the administration. Stonor was returned to his position in 1342, however, and Hillary was instead made a Puisne Justice.

In 1344, he was part of a special commission investigating the demands of the House of Commons in return for granting a tax, and in 1348 he was appointed a justice for an Eyre in Kent, one which never took place.

In 1351, he was tasked with enforcing the Statute of Labourers in Worcestershire, and after the retirement of Sir John Stonor in 1354 he was reappointed as Chief Justice, a position he held until his death in 1356.

Legal offices
Preceded by Sir John Stonor	Chief Justice of the Common Pleas; 1341–1342	Succeeded by Sir John Stonor
Preceded by Sir John Stonor	Chief Justice of the Common Pleas; 1354–1356	Succeeded by Sir Robert Thorpe
