= William Babington (justice) =

English lawyer and judge (c. 1370–1454)

Sir William Babington (c. 1370 – 1454) was an English lawyer and judge hailing from an old Northumbrian noble family.

He was the son of Sir John de Babington and Benedicta Ward.

In 1414, Babington was made a King's Attorney (Attorney General for England and Wales). Three years later, an act of parliament compelled him to accept the title of Serjeant-at-law, which he originally refused due to the expensive inauguration ceremony it required. Rising rapidly through government offices, in 1419 he was made Chief Baron of the Exchequer, the head judge of the jurisdiction exercised by the Exchequer of Pleas.

Babington was named a Justice of the Common Bench in 1420. He presided this court as its Chief Justice from 1423 until his retirement in 1436.

In 1426 he received the Order of the Bath.

== Family ==
Sir William married Margery, daughter of Sir Peter Martell of Chilwell, Nottinghamshire. They had five sons and five daughters.

The conspirator Anthony Babington was a direct descendant.

Legal offices
Preceded by Richard Norton	Chief Justice of the Common Pleas; 1423–1436	Succeeded by Sir John Juyn
Preceded by William Lasingby	Chief Baron of the Exchequer; 1420 – 1423	Succeeded by Sir John Juyn
