= Richard of Staines =

English clerical judge

Richard of Staines (or Richard de Stanes) was an English clerical judge. He acted as an Itinerant Justice, visiting 11 counties in 1208 before his appointment as a justice of the Court of King's Bench in 1209. He became Lord Chief Justice in 1269, and after the coronation of Edward I in 1273 was moved to the Court of Common Pleas. He died in 1277.
