= John Stonor (judge) =

English judge

Sir John Stonor SL (1281–1354) was an English judge and the first notable member of the influential Stonor family. He was the son of Richard Stonor, an Oxfordshire freeholder, with the family name coming from the village of Stonor. After training as a lawyer he was called to the Common Bench as a Serjeant-at-law in 1311, being made a King's Serjeant in 1315 and a justice of the Common Bench on 16 October 1320. He held this position until 1329, other than a period as a justice for the King's Bench between July 1323 and 4 May 1324; in 1324 he was also knighted. On 22 February 1329 he was made Lord Chief Baron of the Exchequer and was made Chief Justice of the Common Pleas on 3 September. He was removed from this position on 2 March 1331, however, possibly due to Edward III, who replaced important officers after he was crowned; there is, however, no evidence that Stonor was politically active.

He was reappointed as Chief Justice on 7 July 1335, but removed on 30 November 1341 after another purge of the administration. He was reappointed yet again on 9 May 1342, making him one of only two Chief Justices to be appointed on three separate occasions. Stonor continued to serve as Chief Justice from 1342 until 22 February 1354, where he left due to weakness, dying the same year. Although most of his time as a justice was at Westminster, he also served in York between 1327–1329 and 1334–1336. Other work included special inquiries into the disorders in 1327 at Bury St Edmunds and Abingdon Abbey and in 1335 at Oxford, official misconduct in 1323 and 1331–1334 and trying rebels in 1323, 1327, and 1331. He was also involved in overseas commissions, including reviewing the trial of Otto Grandson for misadministering Channel Islands in 1319 and diplomatic work in France in 1324 and Spain in 1325.

Legal offices
Preceded by Sir William Herle	Chief Justice of the Common Pleas; 1329–1331	Succeeded by Sir William Herle
Preceded by Sir Walter Norwich	Lord Chief Baron of the Exchequer; 1331–1334	Succeeded by Sir Henry le Scrope
Preceded by Sir William Herle	Chief Justice of the Common Pleas; 1335–1341	Succeeded by Sir Roger Hillary
Preceded by Sir Roger Hillary	Chief Justice of the Common Pleas; 1342–1354	Succeeded by Sir Roger Hillary
