= Gilbert of Preston =

British justice

Sir Gilbert of Preston (1209–1274) was a British justice.

He was the son of Walter of Preston, who was High Sheriff of Northamptonshire between 1206 and 1208. He collected aid in Northamptonshire between 1235 and 1236, and in 1240 was appointed as a royal justice, acting almost continuously until 1254 as a puisne justice on the Eyre circuits of William de York, Roger of Thirkleby and Henry of Bath, and in the common bench at Westminster. He also received many miscellaneous judicial and administrative commissions, and was given a regular salary of £40 in 1253, after 13 years of judgment.

In 1254 Gilbert served as senior justice on an Eyre circuit for the first time. He otherwise continued to sit as a puisne judge at Westminster. In 1260 he was made Chief Justice of the Common Pleas, where he sat almost continuously at court, except when sessions of the court were suspended because of political disturbances. In 1268 he left to travel another Eyre circuit, returning to his position in 1272, only because the death of Henry III halted all Eyre's. He remained Chief Justice of the Common Bench until his death in 1274.

In 1239 Gilbert married Alice, daughter of Henry of Braybrooke, with whom he had no children. As a result he left his possessions to his nephew Laurence of Preston, son of his younger brother William who had predeceased him. He had, through the grant of land in Lincolnshire to the Prior of Sempringham, arranged for a Canon at Sempringham for himself, his ancestors and heirs.

Legal offices
| Preceded by Roger of Thirkleby | Chief Justice of the Common Pleas; 1260–1268 | Succeeded by Martin of Littlebury |
| Preceded by Martin of Littlebury | Chief Justice of the Common Pleas; 1272–1274 | Succeeded by Roger of Seaton |
