= Hervey de Stanton =

Chancellor of the Exchequer of England

Chancellor of the Exchequer of England
- In office 1316–1323
- Monarch: Edward II
- Chancellor: John Sandale (1317–1318); John Hotham (1318–1320); John Salmon (1320–1323)
- Preceded by: John Hotham
- Succeeded by: Walter of Stapledon

Chancellor of the Exchequer of England
- In office 1324–1327
- Monarch: Edward II
- Chancellor: Robert Baldock
- Preceded by: Walter of Stapledon
- Succeeded by: Adam de Harvington

Lord Chief Justice of England
- In office 1323–1324
- Monarch: Edward II
- Chancellor: Robert Baldock
- Preceded by: Henry le Scrope
- Succeeded by: Geoffrey le Scrope

Chief Justice of the Common Pleas
- In office 1326–1326
- Monarch: Edward III
- Chancellor: Robert Baldock
- Preceded by: William Bereford
- Succeeded by: William Herle

Personal details
- Born: 1260
- Died: November 1327 (aged 66–67)

Hervey de Stanton (or Staunton) (1260 – November 1327) was an English judge (serving both as Chief Justice of the King's Bench and as Chief Justice of the Common Pleas) and Chancellor of the Exchequer.

== Origins and early career ==
He was a descendant of Sir William de Staunton, or Stanton, of Staunton, Nottinghamshire, by Athelina, daughter and co-heiress of John de Masters of Bassingham, Lincolnshire. He seems to have held the living of Soham, as early as 1289; afterwards he held the livings of Thurston and Werbeton, and about 1306, on being ordained priest, received the living of East Dereham. In November 1300 there is mention of him as going to the court of Rome.

== Judicial advancement ==
He was a justice itinerant in Cornwall in 1302 and in Durham in 1303. In the parliament of September 1305 he was a receiver of petitions from Ireland and Guernsey, and on 20 April 1306 was appointed one of the judges of the common pleas. On the accession of Edward II, Stanton was reappointed to the common pleas, and is frequently mentioned in judicial commissions.

== Chancellor of the Exchequer and Chief Justice ==
On 28 September 1314, he was appointed one of the barons of the exchequer, and on 22 June 1316 Chancellor of the Exchequer, but continued to act as a judge, and was regularly summoned to parliament with the other judges. In 1323 he was made chief justice of the king's bench, and directed to discharge his duties at the exchequer by a substitute. On 27 March 1324, Stanton resigned the chief justiceship, and on 26 March was reappointed chancellor of the exchequer. He resigned the latter post on 18 July 1326, when he was appointed Chief Justice of the Common Pleas. Stanton seems to have sided with Edward II, and in September Queen Isabella seized eight hundred marks which he had deposited at Bury St Edmunds. He was not reappointed on the accession of Edward III, and the proceedings of an iter he had held at London were reversed.

== Foundation of Michaelhouse ==
As prebend of Husthwaite, York, and parson of East Dereham, he is mentioned as receiving protection on 30 January and 11 February 1327. On 2 March he had licence to alienate in mortmain the manor and advowson of Barenton to the masters and scholars of St Michael's, Cambridge. Stanton died in 1327, before he could give effect to his foundation, and the licence was renewed to his executors. He was buried in the church of St Michael, Cambridge; during the relaying of the chancel floor in the 1850s, de Stanton's sarcophagus was unearthed. His foundation of Michaelhouse was eventually absorbed in Trinity College, where Stanton is still commemorated as a benefactor and a memorial chapel survives.

Legal offices
| Preceded by Sir William Bereford | Chief Justice of the Common Pleas; 1326–1327 | Succeeded by Sir William Herle |
| Preceded by Henry le Scrope | Lord Chief Justice; 1323–1324 | Succeeded by Geoffrey le Scrope |
Political offices
| Preceded by Godfrey Giffard | Chancellor of the Exchequer of England; 1316–1327 | Succeeded by William Catesby |
