= Chief Justice of the Common Pleas =

Archaic position of honour in English common law court

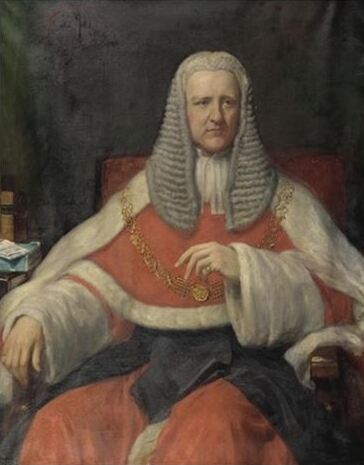
John Coleridge, the last Chief Justice of the Common Pleas

The chief justice of the common pleas was the head of the Court of Common Pleas, also known as the Common Bench, which was the second-highest common law court in the English legal system until 1875, when it, along with the other two common law courts and the equity and probate courts, became part of the High Court of Justice. As such, the chief justice of the Common Pleas was one of the highest judicial officials in England, behind only the lord high chancellor and the Lord Chief Justice of England, who headed the King's Bench (Queen's when the monarch was female).

== History ==
Initially, the position of chief justice of the common pleas was not an appointment; of the justices serving in the court, one would become more respected than his peers, and was therefore considered the "chief" justice.

The position was formalised in 1272, with the raising of Sir Gilbert of Preston to Chief Justice, and from then on, it was a formally-appointed role, similar to the positions of Lord Chief Justice and Chief Baron of the Exchequer. When the High Court was created in 1875, each of the three common law courts became separate divisions of it, each headed by the person who had led the respective court before the merger.

When the Lord Chief Justice and Chief Baron died in 1880, the three common law divisions (Queen's Bench, Exchequer, and Common Pleas) were merged, and John Coleridge, the Chief Justice of the Common Pleas, became Lord Chief Justice, and the offices of Chief Justice of the Common Pleas and Chief Baron were abolished.

== Chief justices of the common pleas ==
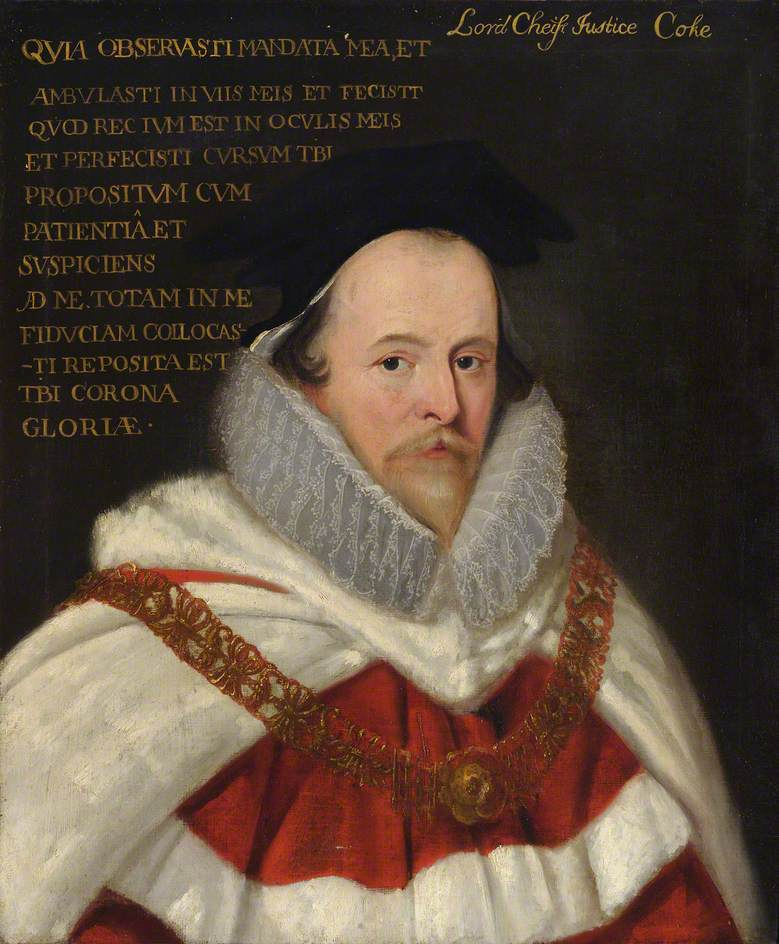
Sir Edward Coke, a famed jurist whose judgements included seminal cases in corporate and competition law and the creation of judicial review

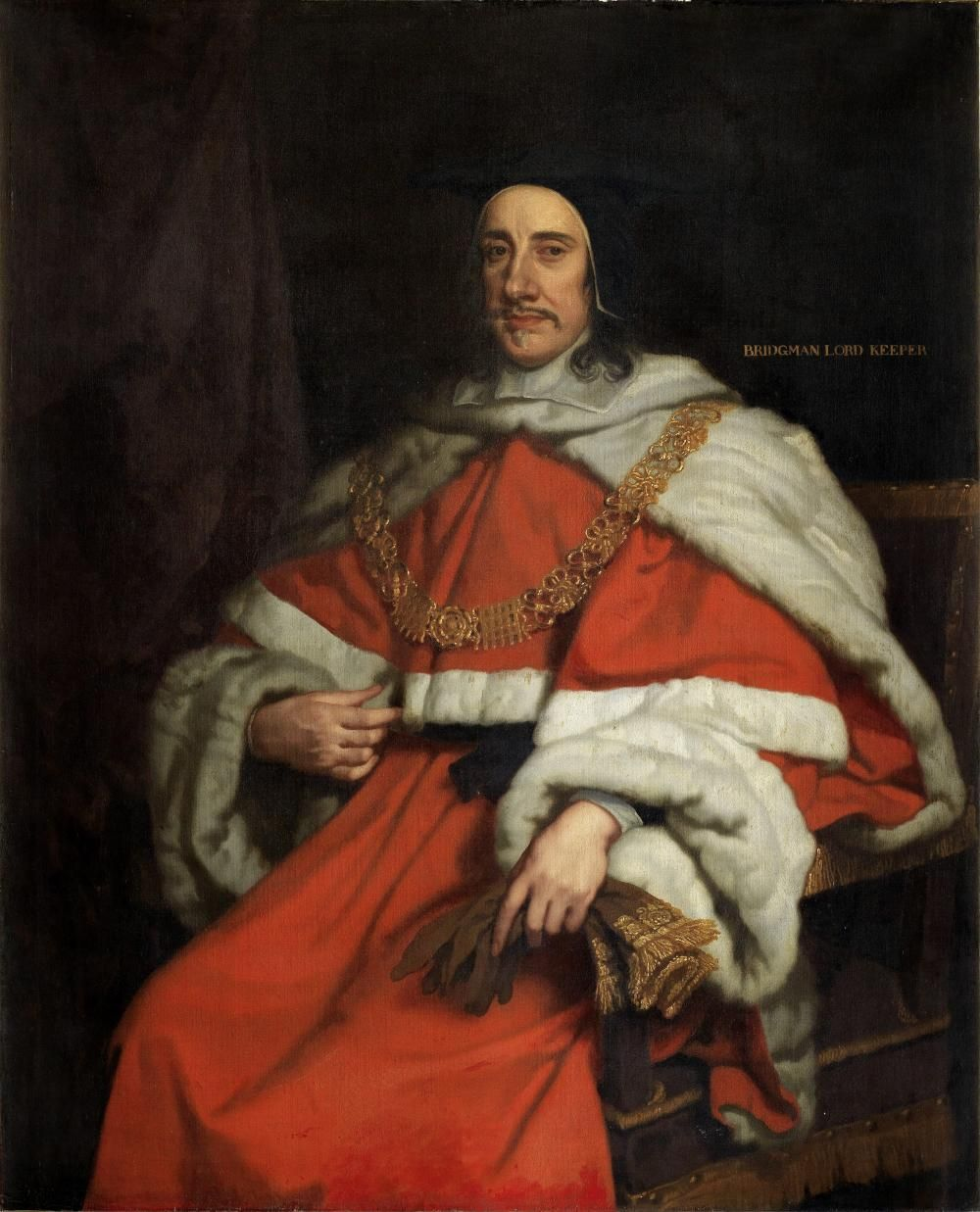
Sir Orlando Bridgeman, who tried the Regicides of Charles I

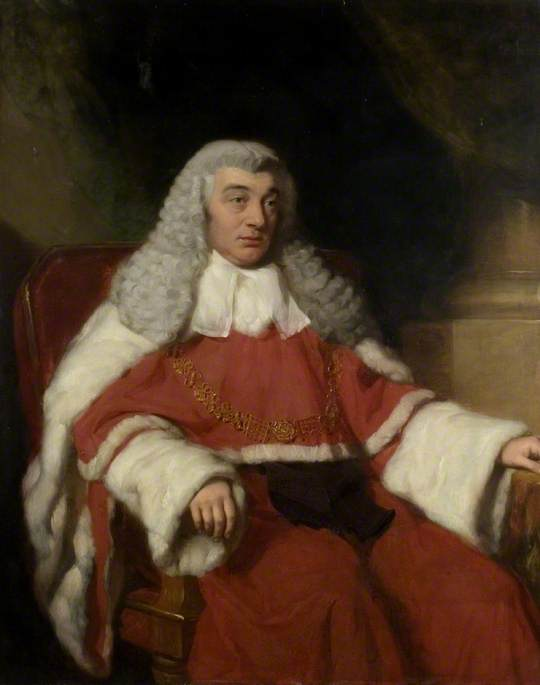
Sir Nicholas Conyngham Tindal, who successfully defended Queen Caroline on charges of adultery in 1820

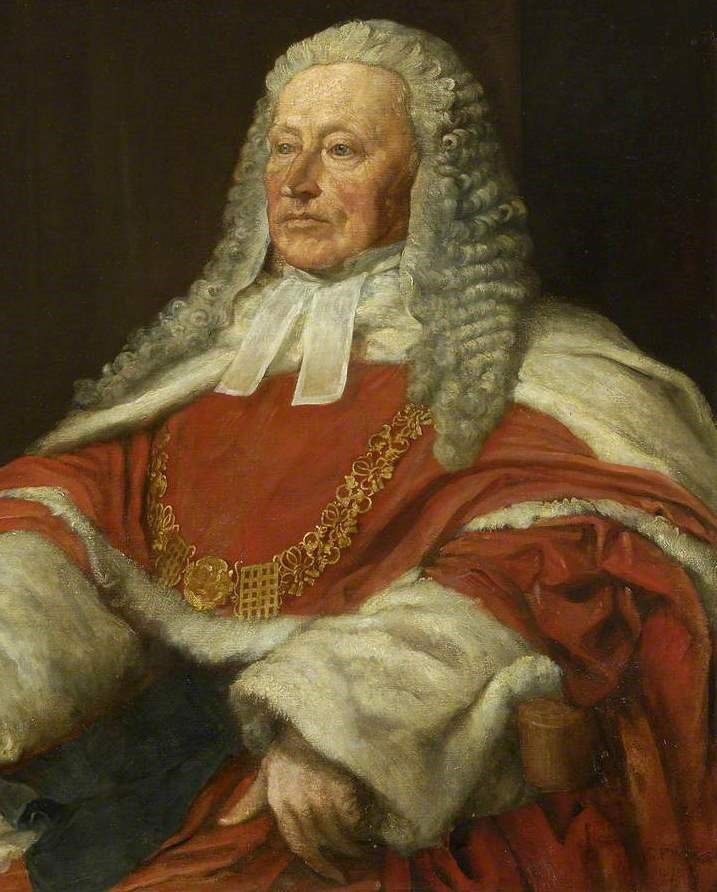
Sir Alexander Cockburn, who was repeatedly refused a peerage on the grounds of "notoriously bad moral character"

Portrait	Name	Term as Chief Justice		Reason for termination
	Simon of Pattishall	1190–1214		Died
	Martin of Pattishall	1217–1229		Retired
	Sir Thomas Moulton	1229–1233		Resigned to travel an Eyre circuit
	William de Raley	1233–1234		Appointed Chief Justice of the King's Bench
	Sir Thomas Moulton	1234–1236		Retired
	Robert of Lexinton	1236–1244		Retired
	Henry of Bath	1245–1249		Stripped of his position after accusations of perverting the course of justice
	Roger of Thirkleby	1249–1256		Replaced
	Henry of Bath	1256–1258		Retired
	Roger of Thirkleby	1258–1260		Died
	Sir Gilbert of Preston	1260–1267		Resigned to travel an Eyre circuit
	Sir Martin of Littlebury	1267–1272		Replaced
	Sir Gilbert of Preston	1272–1274		Died
	Roger of Seaton	1274–1278		Retired
	Sir Thomas Weyland	1278–1289		Removed from his position and exiled
	Sir Ralph Sandwich	1289–1290		Resigned
	John of Mettingham	1290–1301		Died
	Sir Ralph de Hengham	1301–1309		Retired
	Sir William Bereford	1309–1326		Died
	Hervey de Stanton	1326		Not reappointed by Edward III
	Sir William Herle	1327–1329		Resigned to travel an Eyre circuit
	Sir John Stonor	1329–1331		Not reappointed by Edward III
	Sir William Herle	1331–1333		Resigned to travel an Eyre circuit
	Sir Henry le Scrope	1333		Replaced
	Sir William Herle	1333–1335		Retired
	Sir John Stonor	1335–1341		Removed
	Sir Roger Hillary	1341–1342		Replaced
	Sir John Stonor	1342–1354		Retired
	Sir Roger Hillary	1354–1356		Died
	Sir Robert Thorpe	1356–1371		Appointed Lord Chancellor
	Sir William Fyncheden	1371–1374		Died
	Sir Robert Bealknap	1374–1388		Exiled
	Sir Robert Charleton	1388–1395		Died
	William Thirning	1396–1413		Died
	Richard Norton	1413–1420		Died
	Sir William Babington	1423–1436		Retired
	Sir John Juyn	9 February 1436	20 January 1439	Appointed Chief Justice of the King's Bench
	John Cottesmore	20 January 1439	29 August 1439^{†}	Died
	Sir Richard Newton	17 September 1439	13 December 1448^{†}	Died
	Sir John Prysot	16 January 1449	1461^{†}	Died
	Sir Robert Danby	11 May 1461	1471	Not reappointed by Edward IV
	Sir Thomas Bryan	1471	14 August 1500^{†}	Died
	Sir Thomas Wode	28 October 1500	31 August 1502^{†}	Died
	Sir Thomas Frowyk	30 September 1502	7 October 1506^{†}	Died
	Sir Robert Rede	1506	7 January 1519^{†}	Died
	Sir John Ernley	27 January 1519	22 April 1520^{†}	Died
	Sir Robert Brudenell	23 April 1520	22 November 1530	Retired
	Sir Robert Norwich	22 November 1530	April 1535^{†}	Died
	Sir John Baldwin	19 April 1535	24 October 1545^{†}	Died
	Sir Edward Montagu	6 November 1545	1553	Retired
	Sir Richard Morgan	September 1553	1554	Removed after going insane
	Sir Robert Broke	1554	6 September 1558^{†}	Died
	Sir Anthony Browne	5 October 1558	January 1559	Appointed a justice of the Queen's Bench
	Sir James Dyer	January 1559	24 March 1582^{†}	Died
	Sir Edmund Anderson	2 May 1582	1 August 1605^{†}	Died
	Sir Francis Gawdy	August 1605	15 December 1605^{†}	Died
	Sir Edward Coke	30 June 1606	25 October 1613	Appointed Chief Justice of the King's Bench
	Sir Henry Hobart, Bt	26 November 1613	29 December 1625^{†}	Died
	Sir Richard Hutton	December 1625	November 1626	Acting Chief Justice
	Sir Thomas Richardson	22 November 1626	October 1631	Appointed Chief Justice of the King's Bench
	Sir Robert Heath	October 1631	13 September 1634	Dismissed
	Sir John Finch	16 October 1634	1640	Appointed Lord Keeper of the Great Seal
	Sir Edward Littleton	27 January 1640	18 January 1641	Appointed Lord Keeper of the Great Seal
	Sir John Bankes	29 January 1641	28 December 1644^{†}	Died
	Sir Oliver St John	1 October 1648	1660	Excluded from public office following the Restoration
	Sir Orlando Bridgeman, Bt	22 October 1660	May 1668	Appointed Lord Keeper of the Great Seal
	Sir John Vaughan	23 May 1668	10 December 1674^{†}	Died
	Sir Francis North	23 January 1675	20 December 1682	Appointed Lord Keeper of the Great Seal
	Sir Francis Pemberton	January 1683	September 1683	Dismissed
	Sir Thomas Jones	29 September 1683	21 April 1686	Dismissed
	Sir Henry Bedingfield	21 April 1686	6 February 1687^{†}	Died
	Sir Robert Wright	13 April 1687	18 April 1687	Exchanged with Edward Herbert for the position of Chief Justice of the King's Bench
	Sir Edward Herbert	18 April 1687	1689	Dismissed after fleeing to Ireland with James II
	Sir Henry Pollexfen	6 May 1689	15 June 1691^{†}	Died
	Sir George Treby	30 April 1692	13 December 1700^{†}	Died
	Sir Thomas Trevor (Lord Trevor from 1712)	5 July 1701	14 October 1714	Not reappointed by George I
	Sir Peter King	27 October 1714	1 June 1725	Appointed Lord Chancellor
	Sir Robert Eyre	1725	28 December 1735^{†}	Died
	Sir Thomas Reeve	26 January 1736	19 January 1737^{†}	Died
	Sir John Willes	28 January 1737	15 December 1761^{†}	Died
	Sir Charles Pratt (Lord Camden from 1765)	January 1762	30 July 1766	Appointed Lord Chancellor
	Sir John Eardley Wilmot	20 August 1766	26 January 1771	Resigned
	Sir William de Grey	January 1771	June 1780	Resigned
	The Lord Loughborough	June 1780	28 January 1793	Appointed Lord Keeper of the Great Seal
	Sir James Eyre	11 February 1793	1 July 1799^{†}	Died
	The Lord Eldon	17 July 1799	1801	Appointed Lord Chancellor
	The Lord Alvanley	22 May 1801	19 March 1804^{†}	Died
	Sir James Mansfield	24 April 1804	21 February 1814	Resigned
	Sir Vicary Gibbs	February 1814	November 1818	Resigned
	Sir Robert Dallas	November 1818	1824	Retired
	The Lord Gifford	9 January 1824	5 April 1824	Appointed Master of the Rolls
	Sir William Best	15 April 1824	June 1829	Retired
	Sir Nicholas Conyngham Tindal	9 June 1829	6 July 1846^{†}	Died
	Sir Thomas Wilde	6 July 1846	15 July 1850	Appointed Lord Chancellor
	Sir John Jervis	16 July 1850	1 November 1856^{†}	Died
	Sir Alexander Cockburn, Bt	November 1856	24 June 1859	Appointed Chief Justice of the Queen's Bench
	Sir William Erle	June 1859	November 1866	Retired
	Sir William Bovill	November 1866	1 November 1873^{†}	Died
	Sir John Coleridge (Lord Coleridge from 1874)	November 1873	20 November 1880	Court merged with the Court of Queen's Bench and the Exchequer of Pleas; became the first Lord Chief Justice of a unified Queen's Bench Division.

== Peerages created for the lord chief justice of the common pleas ==
Since the Act of Union 1707
Lord Chief Justice	Title	Created	Current status	Other judicial roles
Sir Thomas Trevor	Baron Trevor		Extinct 9 September 1824	None
Sir Peter King	Baron King		Extinct 31 January 2018	Lord High Chancellor of Great Britain
Sir Charles Pratt	Earl Camden		Extant	Lord High Chancellor of Great Britain
Sir Charles Pratt	Baron Camden		Extant	Lord High Chancellor of Great Britain
Sir William de Grey	Baron Walsingham		Extant	None
Sir Alexander Wedderburn	Earl of Rosslyn		Extant	Lord High Chancellor of Great Britain
Sir Alexander Wedderburn	Baron Loughborough		Extant	Lord High Chancellor of Great Britain
Sir Alexander Wedderburn	Baron Loughborough		Extinct 2 January 1805	Lord High Chancellor of Great Britain
Sir John Scott	Earl of Eldon		Extant	Lord High Chancellor of Great Britain
Sir John Scott	Baron Eldon		Extant	Lord High Chancellor of Great Britain
Sir Richard Arden	Baron Alvanley		Extinct 24 June 1857	Master of the Rolls
Sir Robert Gifford	Baron Gifford		Extant	Master of the Rolls
Sir William Best	Baron Wynford		Extant	None
Sir Thomas Wilde	Baron Truro		Extinct 8 March 1899	Lord High Chancellor of Great Britain
Sir John Coleridge	Baron Coleridge		Extant	Lord Chief Justice of England

== Legacy ==
A Wetherspoon pub in Keswick, Cumbria is named "The Chief Justice of the Common Pleas", this is due to the current building constructed in 1901 been built on land which was formally the site of a ‘workhouse’ - founded in the will (dated 1642) of Sir John Bankes. The current building which housed the towns magistrates’ court and police station until the year 2000, was built next to the towns main post office itself constructed ten years earlier around 1890.

== Bibliography ==
- Kiralfy, A. K. R. (1962). Potter's Historical Introduction to English Law and Its Institutions. London: Sweet & Maxwell, Ltd.
