= Thomas Weyland =

English lawyer, administrator and landowner

Sir Thomas Weyland (about 1230 – January 1298) was an English lawyer, administrator and landowner from Suffolk who rose to be Chief Justice of the Common Pleas under King Edward I but was removed for malpractice and exiled.

== Early life ==
Born about 1230, he was the third son of Herbert Weyland and his wife Beatrice, one of six daughters of Stephen Witnesham, a minor landowner from the village of that name. His three brothers, John, Richard and William, also pursued administrative and judicial careers. He first appears in official records in 1251 as an attorney for his brother John for the making of a final concord. In 1258 he paid 100 marks for the manor of Chillesford and purchased a second manor in 1258 at Blaxhall for 300 marks. It is not certain how he obtained such money, but it was probably from legal work in which he acquired the knowledge needed for his later progress. Although he had become a subdeacon to allow a career in the church, he reverted to lay status and was knighted in 1270.

== Judicial career ==
In 1274 he was made a justice of the Common Bench after the death of his older brother William, who had previously held such a position. He served as a junior justice for four years, and was appointed Chief Justice in 1278 after the retirement of Roger Seaton, holding office for 11 years until his removal in 1289. This period is the first for which substantial law reports survive, presenting a mixed view. While they show he had a clear and sharp legal mind, often deciding litigation cases on his own or with one colleague, he was also involved in several instances of corruption and misconduct, including editing his plea roll in a land case involving one of his relatives, for which he was rewarded with an interest in the property in question. Many of these suspect cases were only turned up after his removal from office and, although some allegations were shown to be false, many were not. During this time he made large acquisitions of property, including seven manors in Suffolk, three in Essex and several others elsewhere. He spent an average of £150 a year on property while in office, and though much of the money may have come from the profits of his and his wife's landholdings or from private legal work, his relative lack of scruples makes it possible some came from corruption.

== Downfall and exile ==
His removal from office in 1289 was not, however, as a result of judicial misconduct. On 20 July 1289 two of his servants committed a murder at a village fair, killing William Carwel, an Irish servant of the Earl of Norfolk. The killing may have been as a result of a drunken brawl, but it is probable it was part of bitter factional fighting between followers of the earl, of whom Weyland was one of the leading councillors. After the servants returned to his house at Monewden he failed to have them arrested, despite knowing of the murder, thereby becoming an accessory. Due to the earl's desire to have the matter dealt with, a warrant was issued for a court of enquiry on 4 September and the two men were executed on 14 September. The jurors in the matter also indicted the Chief Justice for harbouring the killers, and orders were given for his arrest. A clerk of the sheriff of Suffolk was sent to capture him, but soon after his arrest he escaped under cover of darkness. He made his way to the Greyfriars house at Babwell on the outskirts of Bury St Edmunds, where he took the habit of the Franciscan order and received sanctuary. After his location became known, King Edward sent orders to his fellow justice Robert Malet to starve him out. Thomas surrendered early in 1290, most likely in return for safe travel to the Tower of London, where he was offered a choice between standing trial, perpetual imprisonment, and exile, of which he chose exile. On 20 February he took an oath not to return to any English territory, including Ireland, and was given nine days to reach Dover, his port of departure. By 1292 he had settled in Paris, but was pardoned by the king in 1297 and allowed to return home, where he died in 1298.

== Family ==
In about 1266 he married Anna, daughter of Richard Colville, and they had a son John. Inheriting his father's lands, he too was knighted and married Mary, daughter of a major Suffolk landowner, Sir Richard Braose.

Legal offices
Preceded by Roger of Seaton	Chief Justice of the Common Pleas; 1278–1289	Succeeded by Ralph Sandwich
