= Justice of the King's Bench =

Judicial position in medieval England

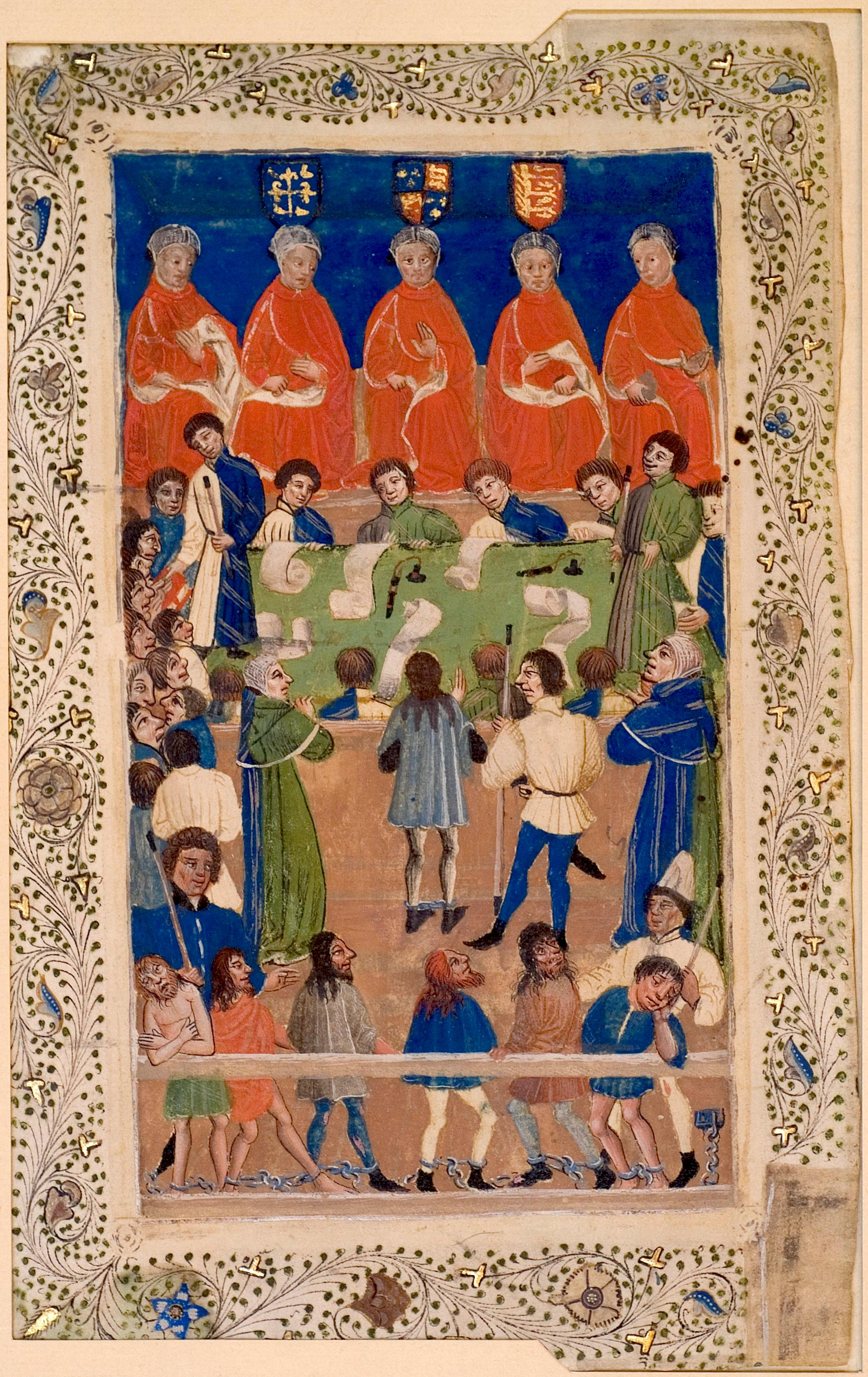
The Justices of the King's Bench at work. This illuminated manuscript from about 1460 is the earliest known depiction of the English court.

Justice of the King's Bench, or Justice of the Queen's Bench during the reign of a female monarch, was a puisne judicial position within the Court of King's Bench, under the Chief Justice. The King's Bench was a court of common law which modern academics argue was founded independently in 1234, having previously been part of the curia regis. The court became a key part of the Westminster courts, along with the Exchequer of Pleas (qualified to hear cases involving revenue owed to the King) and the Court of Common Pleas (qualified to hear cases between subject and subject); the latter was deliberately stripped of its jurisdiction by the King's Bench and Exchequer, through the Bill of Middlesex and Writ of Quominus respectively. As a result, the courts jockeyed for power. In 1828 Henry Brougham, a Member of Parliament, complained in Parliament that as long as there were three courts unevenness was inevitable, saying that "It is not in the power of the courts, even if all were monopolies and other restrictions done away, to distribute business equally, as long as suitors are left free to choose their own tribunal", and that there would always be a favourite court, which would therefore attract the best lawyers and judges and entrench its position. The outcome was the Supreme Court of Judicature Act 1873, under which all the central courts were made part of a single Supreme Court of Judicature. Eventually the government created a High Court of Justice under Lord Coleridge by an Order in Council of 16 December 1880. At this point, the King's Bench formally ceased to exist.

The number of Justices at any one time varied; until 1348 it fluctuated between two and four, while between 1349 and 1391 there was only one. The number continued to change, but after 1522 was (in principle) fixed at three. Acts of Parliament in 1830 and 1868 provided funding for a fourth and fifth Justice respectively. Salaries were first established in 1278, with one Justice receiving 50 marks a year and the others 40. From 1307 all received 40, with additional pay increases resulting in each being paid £100 by 1389. Salaries of £1,000 a year were provided from 1645, increasing to £1,500 in 1714, £2,000 in 1759, £3,000 in 1799 and (after variations) the salary settled at £5,000 in 1828. In 1799 pension provisions were first made, starting at £2,000 a year and peaking at £3,500 in 1825.

== List of justices ==
Name	Born/Died	Active service	Reason for termination	Notes
Richard Staines	d. 1277/8	1272–1274	Became a Justice of the Common Pleas	
Nicholas Stapleton	d. 1290	1273–1274; 1278; 1290		
Walter de Helyun		1273–1278	Became a Justice of the Common Pleas	
William Saham		1278; 1288–1290	Became justice of an eyre circuit Convicted of judicial misconduct	
Walter Hopton	1235–1295/6	1274–1278	Became senior justice of a court in Wales	
Walter Wimborne		1276–1289		
Ellis Sutton		1285–1287		
William Saham	c. 1225–1292	1288–1290	Convicted of judicial misconduct	
Gilbert de Thornton	c. 1245–1295	1290	Became Chief Justice of the King's Bench	
Roger Brabazon	c. 1247–1317	1290–1295	Became Chief Justice of the King's Bench	
Robert Malet	d.1294	1290–1294	Died	
John Lovel		1294–1230		
Gilbert de Rothbury	c. 1260–1321	1296 – 10 March 1316	Became a Justice of the Common Pleas	
William Ormesby	d. 1317	1296–1303	Became an Assize justice	
Henry Spigurnel	c. 1261–1328	1301–1323	Retired	
Lambert de Trickingham		6 August 1316 – 6 August 1320	Became a Baron of the Exchequer	
Robert de Malberthorp	d. 1331/2	6 August 1320 – 1 May 1329	Became Chief Justice of the King's Bench	
John Stonor	c. 1281 – August 1354	1323 – 3 May 1324	Became a Justice of the Common Pleas	
Walter Friskeney		3 May 1324 – 1326; 6 March 1327 – 1328	Became a Justice of the Common Pleas	
Robert Baynard	d.1329/30	9 March 1327 – 1329	Became an Assize justice	
John Shardelow	d. 5 March 1344	11 September 1329 – 29 January 1332	Became a Justice of the Common Pleas	
Henry Hambury	c. 1271 – c. 1350	30 December 1329 – 1330	Became an Assize justice	
Richard de Willoughby	c. 1290 – 14 March 1362	22 December 1330 – 28 March 1332	Became Chief Justice of the Common Pleas	
Thomas Louth		22 December 1330 – 1331	Became Chief Justice of the Justiciar's Court in Ireland	
Geoffrey Edenham		18 January 1331 – 1333		
Thomas Bacon	d. 1336	28 January 1332 – 1335		
William Denum	d. 1350	1332–1334		
William de Shareshull	1289/90–1369	20 March 1334 – 14 May 1334; 22 October 1344 – 10 November 1345	Became a Justice of the Common Pleas; Became a Justice of the Common Pleas	
Robert de Scardeburgh	c. 1348	24 September 1334 – 1344	Became Chief Justice of the Common Pleas in Ireland	
William Faunt		1338		
Robert Brundish		1338		
William Scott	d. 1352/6	2 May 1339 – 8 January 1341	Became Chief Justice of the Common Pleas	
Roger Baukwell	d. c. 1350	8 January 1341 – 1348	Became an Assize justice	
William Basset	d. 1356/7	28 October 1341 – 1353	Retired	
Adam Stonegrave		1342		
William Thorpe	d. 27 May 1361	1345 – 16 November 1346	Became Chief Justice of the King's Bench	
Thomas Seton	d. 1359/60	1354–1355; 5 July 1357	Became a Justice of the Common Pleas	
William de Notton	c. 1365	12 October 1355 – 10 July 1361	Became Chief Justice of the King's Bench for Ireland	
Thomas Ingleby		25 June 1361 – 1377		
Robert Tresilian	d. 19 February 1388	6 May 1378 – 22 June 1381		
David Hanmer	d. 1387	26 February 1383 – 1386		
John Lockton		25 October 1387		
John Hill	d. 1408	20 May 1389 – 1407		
Hugh Huls	d. 3 July 1415	20 May 1389; 30 May 1394 - 1414	Retired	
Robert Tyrwhitt	d. 6 January 1428	4 May 1408 – 6 January 1428	Died	
Roger Horton	d. 30 April 1423	16 June 1415 – 1422		
William Cheyne	d. 1443	16 June 1415 – 21 January 1424	Became Chief Justice of the King's Bench	
John Hals		23 January 1424 - 1434		
William Westbury	d. 25 December 1448	6 February 1426 – 21 February 1445	Retired	
William Goderede	d. 1 January 1455	3 July 1434 – 1 January 1455	Died	
William Yelverton	d. 27 March 1476	1 July 1443 – 6 April 1471		
John Markham		6 February 1444 – 13 May 1461	Became Chief Justice of the King's Bench	
Richard Bingham	22 May 1476	5 May 1445 – 6 April 1471		
Ralph Pole	d. 1460	3 July 1453 – 18 March 1460		
Thomas Billing	d. 5 May 1481	9 August 1464 – 23 January 1469	Became Chief Justice of the King's Bench	
William Laken	d. 6 October 1475	4 June 1465 – 6 October 1475	Died	
Richard Nele		18 April 1469 – 17 June 1471	Became a Justice of the Common Pleas	
John Needham	d. 25 April 1480	17 June 1471 – 25 April 1480	Died	
Thomas Yonge	d. 3/4 May 1477	29 April 1475 – 3/4 May 1477	Died	
Guy Fairfax	d. 1495	8 October 1477 – 1495	Died	
William Jenney	d. 22/23 December 1483	14 May 1481 – 22/23 December 1483	Died	
John Sulyard	d. 14 March 1488	22 October 1484 – 14 March 1488	Died	
Thomas Tremayle	d. 10 September 1508	16 June 1488 – 10 September 1508	Died	
Robert Rede	d. 7/8 January 1519	24 November 1495 – 26 November 1506	Became Chief Justice of the Common Pleas	
Robert Brudenell	1461 – 30 January 1531	28 April 1507 – 23 April 1520	Became Chief Justice of the Common Pleas	
Humphrey Coningsby	d. 2 June 1535	21 May 1509 – 28 November 1533		
John More	d. 5 November 1530	23 April 1520 – 5 November 1530	Died	
John FitzJames	c. 1470 – 1538	6 February 1522 – 24 January 1526	Became Chief Justice of the King's Bench	
John Port	d. March 1540	10 July 1525 – March 1540	Died	
John Spelman	d. 26 January 1546	3 July 1531 – 26 January 1546	Died	
Walter Luke	d. 21 July 1544	28 November 1533 – 21 July 1544	Died	
William Coningsby	d. 10 September 1540	5 July 1540 – 10 September 1540	Died	
Edmund Mervin	d. 1553	22 November 1540 – 1553	Died	
Thomas Bromley	d. 15 May 1555	5 November 1544 – 4 October 1553	Became Chief Justice of the Queen's Bench	
William Portman	1497/8 – 5 February 1557	14 May 1546 – 11 June 1555	Became Chief Justice of the Queen's Bench	
John Whiddon	d. 27 January 1576	4 October 1553 – 27 January 1576	Died	
William Dalison	d. 18 January 1559	2 November 1555 – 18 January 1559	Died	
Francis Morgan	d. 19 August 1558	23 January 1558 – 19 August 1558	Died	
James Dyer	1510 – 24 March 1582	23 April 1558 – 27 April 1558	Retired	
William Rastell	d. 27 August 1565	27 October 1558 – 10 February 1563		
Reginald Corbet	d. 19 November 1566	16 October 1559 – 19 November 1566	Died	
John Southcote	d. 18 April 1585	10 February 1563 – 1 June 1584	Retired	
Thomas Carus	d. 5 July 1571	31 May 1567 – 5 July 1571	Died	
Christopher Wray		14 May 1572 – 8 November 1574	Became Chief Justice of the Queen's Bench	
Thomas Gawdy	d. 5 November 1588	16 November 1574 – 5 November 1588	Died	
John Jeffrey		15 May 1576 – 12 October 1577	Became Chief Baron of the Exchequer	
William Ayloffe	d. 17 November 1584	3 February 1578 – 17 November 1584	Died	
John Clench	d. 18/19 August 1607	29 May 1584 – 7 February 1602	Retired	
Robert Shute	d. 1590	8 February 1585 – 1590	Died	
Francis Gawdy		25 November 1588 – 26 August 1605	Became Chief Justice of the Common Pleas	
Edward Fenner	d. 23/24 January 1612	16 May 1590 – 23/24 January 1612	Died	
Christopher Yelverton	d. 1 November 1612	8 February 1602 – 1 November 1612	Died	
David Williams	d. 22 January 1613	4 February 1604 – 22 January 1613	Died	
Lawrence Tanfield		13 January 1606 – 25 June 1607	Became Chief Baron of the Exchequer	
John Croke	d. 23 January 1620	25 June 1607 – 23 January 1620	Died	
John Doddridge	d. 12 September 1628	25 November 1612 – 12 September 1628	Died	
Robert Houghton	d. 6 February 1624	21 April 1613 – 6 February 1624	Died	
Thomas Chamberlayne		8 October 1620 – 20 October 1624	Became a Justice of the Common Pleas	
William Jones	d. 10 December 1640	17 October 1624 – 10 December 1640	Died	
James Whitelocke	d. 20 June 1632	18 October 1624 – 20 June 1632	Died	
George Croke		9 October 1628 – 25 March 1641		
Robert Berkeley	d. 5 August 1656	11 October 1632 – 12 September 1643	Discharged by Parliament	
Robert Heath		23 January 1641 – 11 October 1642	Became Chief Justice of the King's Bench	
Thomas Malet		1 July 1641 – 24 November 1645; 31 May 1660 – 13 June 1663	Discharged by Parliament; Discharged	
Francis Bacon	d. 22 August 1657	14 October 1642 – 8 February 1649	Declined reappointment	
Robert Brerewood		31 January 1644 – June 1646	Ceased to act after the fall of Oxford	
Henry Rolle		7 October 1645 – 15 November 1648	Became Chief Justice of the King's Bench	
Samuel Browne		22 November 1648 – 8 February 1649	Declined reappointment	
Philip Jermyn		22 November 1648 – 18 March 1654	Not reappointed	
Robert Nicholas		12 June 1649 – 23 January 1654; 19 January 1660 – May 1660	Became a Baron of the Exchequer; Not reappointed	
Richard Aske	d. 23 June 1656	12 June 1649 – 23 June 1656	Died	
Richard Newdigate		30 May 1654 – 1 May 1655; 13 June 1657 – 19 January 1660	Not reappointed Became Chief Justice of the Upper Bench	
Peter Warburton		11 February 1656 – May 1659	Not reappointed	
Roger Hill		19 January 1660 – May 1660	Not reappointed	
Thomas Twisden	d. 2 January 1683	27 June 1660 – 2 January 1683	Died	
Wadham Wyndham		24 November 1660 – 24/5 December 1668	Died	
John Kelynge		18 June 1663 – 21 November 1665	Became Chief Justice of the King's Bench	
William Morton	d. 23 September 1672	23 November 1665 – 23 September 1672	Died	
Richard Raynsford		6 February 1669 – 12 April 1676	Became Chief Justice of the King's Bench	
William Wilde	d. 23 November 1679	21 January 1673 – 29 April 1679	Dismissed	
Thomas Jones		13 April 1676 – 29 September 1683	Became Chief Justice of the Common Pleas	
William Dolben	d. 25 January 1694	23 October 1678 – 18 April 1683; 18 March 1689 – 25 January 1694	Dismissed; Died	
Francis Pemberton		1 May 1679 – 16 February 1680	Dismissed	
Thomas Raymond	d. 14 July 1683	24 April 1680 – 14 July 1683	Died	
Francis Wythens		25 April 1683 – 21 April 1687	Dismissed	
Richard Holloway		25 September 1683 – 2 July 1688	Dismissed	
Thomas Walcot	d. 6 September 1685	22 October 1683 – 6 September 1685	Died	
Robert Wright		10 October 1685 – 13 April 1687	Became Chief Justice of the Common Pleas	
John Powell		13 April 1687 – 2 July 1688	Dismissed	
Richard Allibond	d. 22 August 1688	27 April 1687 – 22 August 1688	Died	
Thomas Powell		6 July 1688 – 1689	Not reappointed after the Glorious Revolution	
Robert Baldock		6 July 1688 – 1689	Not reappointed after the Glorious Revolution	
Thomas Stringer		22 October 1688 – 1689	Not reappointed after the Glorious Revolution	
William Gregory	d. 28 May 1696	8 May 1689 – 28 May 1696	Died	
Giles Eyre	d. 2 June 1695	8 May 1689 – 2 June 1695	Died	
Samuel Eyre	d. 12 September 1698	19 February 1694 – 12 September 1698	Died	
Thomas Rokeby	d. 26 November 1699	25 October 1695 – 26 November 1699	Died	
John Turton		27 June 1696 – 8 June 1702	Dismissed	
Henry Gould	d. 26 March 1710	30 January 1699 – 26 March 1710	Died	
Littleton Powys		26 January 1701 – 26 October 1726	Retired	
John Powell		23 June 1702 – 2 June 1713	Retired	
Robert Eyre		12 May 1710 – 21 November 1723	Became Chief Baron of the Exchequer	
Thomas Powys		3 June 1713 – 14 October 1714	Dismissed	
John Pratt		20 November 1714 – 19 May 1718	Became Chief Justice of the King's Bench	
John Fortescue Aland		19 May 1718 – 27 September 1727	Dismissed	
Robert Raymond		31 January 1724 – 2 March 1725	Became Chief Justice of the King's Bench	
James Reynolds		16 March 1725 – 28 April 1730	Became Chief Baron of the Exchequer	
Edmund Probyn		4 November 1726 – 24 November 1740	Became Chief Baron of the Exchequer	
Francis Page	d. 19 December 1741	27 September 1727 – 19 December 1741	Died	
William Lee		13 June 1730 – 8 June 1737	Became Chief Justice of the King's Bench	
William Chapple	d. 15 March 1745	16 June 1737 – 15 March 1745	Died	
Martin Wright		24 November 1740 – 6 February 1755	Retired	
Thomas Denison		11 February 1742 – 14 February 1765	Retired	
Michael Foster	d. 7 November 1763	22 April 1745 – 7 November 1763	Died	
John Eardley Wilmot		11 February 1755 – 20 August 1766	Became Chief Justice of the Common Pleas	
Joseph Yates		23 January 1764 – 16 February 1770	Became a Justice of the Common Pleas	
Richard Aston	d. 1 March 1778	24 April 1765 – 1 March 1778	Died	
James Hewitt		5 November 1766 – 24 November 1767	Became Lord Chancellor of Ireland	
Edward Willes	d. 14 January 1787	29 January 1768 – 14 January 1787	Died	
William Blackstone		16 February 1770 – 25 June 1770	Became a Justice of the Common Pleas	
William Henry Ashurst		25 June 1770 – 3 June 1799	Retired	
Francis Buller		6 May 1778 – 18 June 1794	Became a Justice of the Common Pleas	
Nash Grose		9 February 1787 – 16 June 1813	Retired	
Soulden Lawrence		18 June 1794 – 31 March 1808	Became a Justice of the Common Pleas	
Simon Le Blanc	d. 15 April 1816	5 June 1799 – 15 April 1816	Died	
John Bayley		7 May 1808 – 11 November 1830	Became a Baron of the Exchequer	
Henry Dampier	d. 3 February 1816	23 June 1813 – 3 February 1816	Died	
George Sowley Holroyd		20 February 1816 – 17 November 1828	Retired	
Charles Abbott		3 May 1816 – 4 November 1818	Became Chief Justice of the King's Bench	
William Best		28 November 1818 – 15 April 1824	Became Chief Justice of the Common Pleas	
Joseph Littledale		4 May 1824 – 11 February 1841	Retired	
James Parke		17 November 1828 – 29 April 1834	Became a Baron of the Exchequer	
William Elias Taunton	d. 11 January 1835	11 November 1830 – 11 January 1835	Died	
John Patteson		11 November 1830 – 11 February 1852	Retired	
John Williams	d. 14/15 September 1846	29 April 1834 – 14/15 September 1846	Died	
John Taylor Coleridge		26 January 1835 – 14 June 1858	Retired	
William Wightman	d. 10 December 1863	15 February 1841 – 10 December 1863	Died	
William Erle		27 October 1846 – 24 June 1859	Became Chief Justice of the Common Pleas	
Charles John Crompton	d. 30 October 1865	11 February 1852 – 30 October 1865	Died	
Hugh Hill		14 June 1858 – 3 December 1861	Retired	
Colin Blackburn		28 June 1859 – 1 November 1875	Became a Justice of the High Court of Justice (Queen's Bench Division)	
John Mellor		3 December 1861 – 1 November 1875	Became a Justice of the High Court of Justice (Queen's Bench Division)	
William Shee		19 December 1863 – 19 February 1868	Died	
Robert Lush		2 November 1865 – 1 November 1875	Became a Justice of the High Court of Justice (Queen's Bench Division)	
James Hannen		25 February 1868 – 20 November 1872	Became a Justice of the High Court of Justice (Probate Division	
George Hayes	d. 24 November 1869	25 August 1868 – 24 November 1869	Died	
John Richard Quain		5 January 1872 – 1 November 1875	Became a Justice of the High Court of Justice (Queen's Bench Division)	
Thomas Dickson Archibald		20 November 1872 – 6 February 1875	Became a Justice of the Common Pleas	
William Field		6 February 1875 – 1 November 1875	Became a Justice of the High Court of Justice (Queen's Bench Division)	

== Bibliography ==
- Ball, F. Elrington (2005). The Judges in Ireland, 1221-1921. The Lawbook Exchange, Ltd. ISBN 1-58477-428-2.
- Brougham, Henry (1828). Present State of the Law. Lea & Carey. OCLC 213519284.
- Foss, Edward (1870). A Biographical Dictionary of the Justices of England (1066–1870). Spottiswoode and Company. OCLC 181068114.
- Mackay, James (2002). Halsbury's Laws of England. Vol. 10 (4th ed.). LexisNexis. ISBN 90-411-1742-3.
- Sainty, John (1993). The Judges of England 1272 -1990: a list of judges of the superior courts. Oxford: Selden Society. OCLC 29670782.

== See also ==
- Category:Justices of the King's Bench
