= Lockton (disambiguation) =

Lockton is a North Yorkshire, England.

Lockton may also refer to:

- Lockton (horse), a racehorse
- Lockton (surname), including a list of people surnamed Lockton
- Lockton, Ontario, Canada
- Lockton Companies, an American insurance broker
