= Hugh Hill =

Hugh Hill may refer to:

- Sir Hugh Hill, 1st Baronet (1728–1795) of the Hill baronets, member for Londonderry City in Parliament of Ireland
- Sir Hugh Hill (judge) (1802–1871), British judge
- Hugh Hill (privateer) (1740–1829), American mariner and Revolutionary War privateer
- Hugh Lawson White Hill (1810–1892), American politician
- Hugh Hill (baseball) (1879–1958), American baseball player
- Hugh Morgan Hill (1921–2009), American folklorist & street performer, a.k.a. Brother Blue

== See also ==
- Hill (surname)
