= Taikoo Place =

Commercial building complex in Hong Kong

Taikoo Place 太古坊

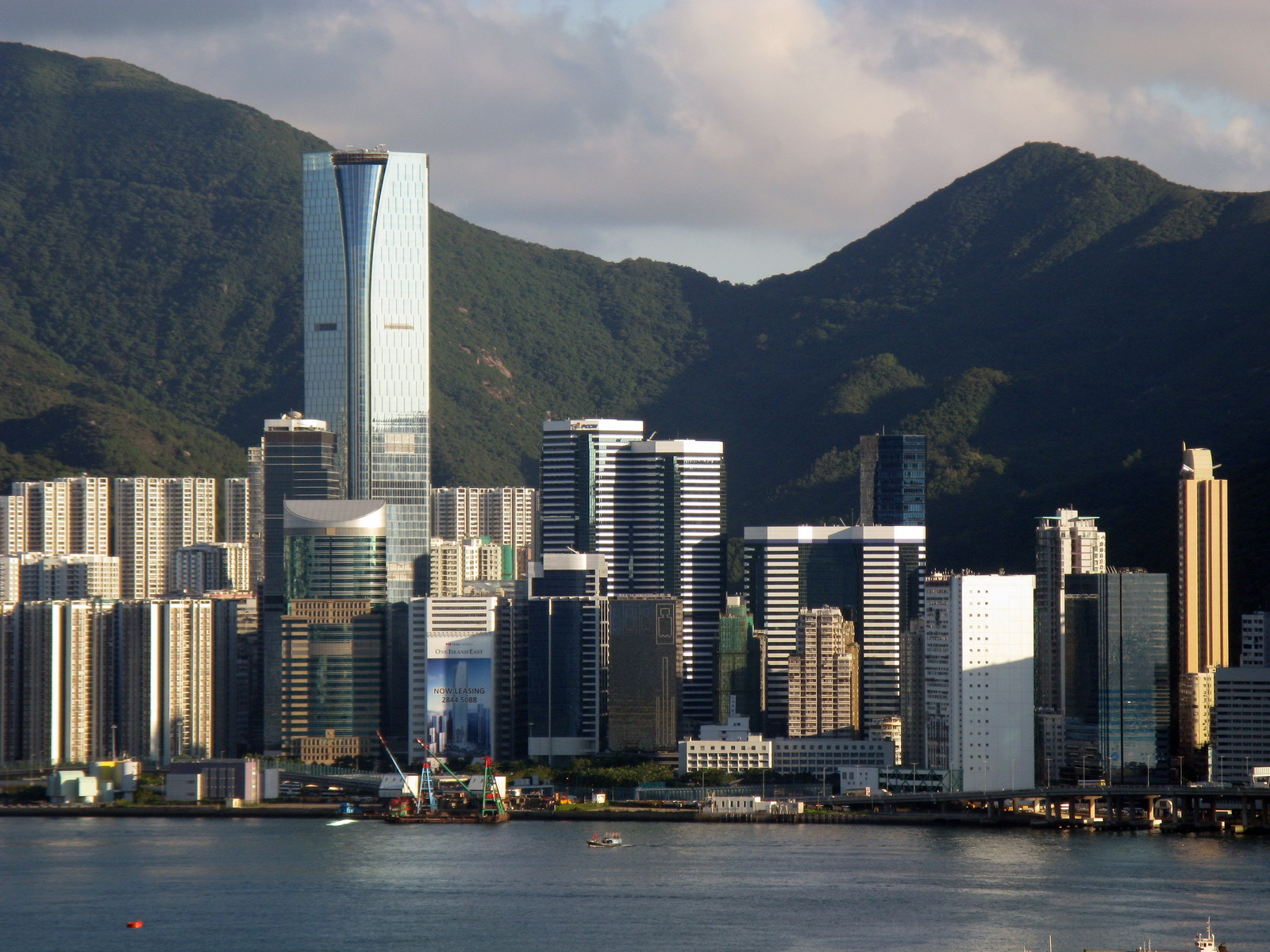
- Industry: Real estate
- Headquarters: Quarry Bay and Tai Koo Shing, Hong Kong
- Owner: Swire Properties
- Website: swireproperties.com

Taikoo Place (Chinese: 太古坊; Jyutping: taai3 gu2 fong1; pinyin: Tàigǔfāng) is a commercial building complex located in Quarry Bay, east Hong Kong Island, Hong Kong. It comprises grade A office towers, car parking, clubs, office apartment, parks, and shops. It is reachable by MTR Island line (MTR). These complexes are all managed by Swire Properties since the beginning from Taikoo Sugar Refinery, the subsequent Taikoo Dockyard and the recent demolitions of the industrial buildings.

Map of Taikoo Place

== Timeline ==
Since the 1980s, Taikoo Place has been redeveloped to become a unique metropolitan environment for business and entertainment. Until now, notable amenities include the Butterfield's private members club. It is recognized as a popular choice for younger workers to seek employment.

Taikoo Place hosts many advertisement and information technology firms. The PCCW Tower, the tower just next to Dorset House is where the headquarters of PCCW are located, a Hong Kong-based telecommunication company. The local headquarters of IBM and JWT is also situated there, occupying the first 15 storeys. Ironically, more IT firms choose to have their Hong Kong base in Taikoo Place rather than in Cyberport, which was specifically built for this purpose.

The neighbourhood of Taikoo Place used to be residential and industrial. Once Taikoo Place was built, the neighbourhood has been undergoing constant development and gentrification. Concerned about the urban development, Swire Properties has begun construction of serviced apartments north of Devon House, due for completion in 2015.

== Current buildings ==
Gammon Construction has been one of the major construction company involved.

=== One Island East ===
One Island East
- 港島東中心
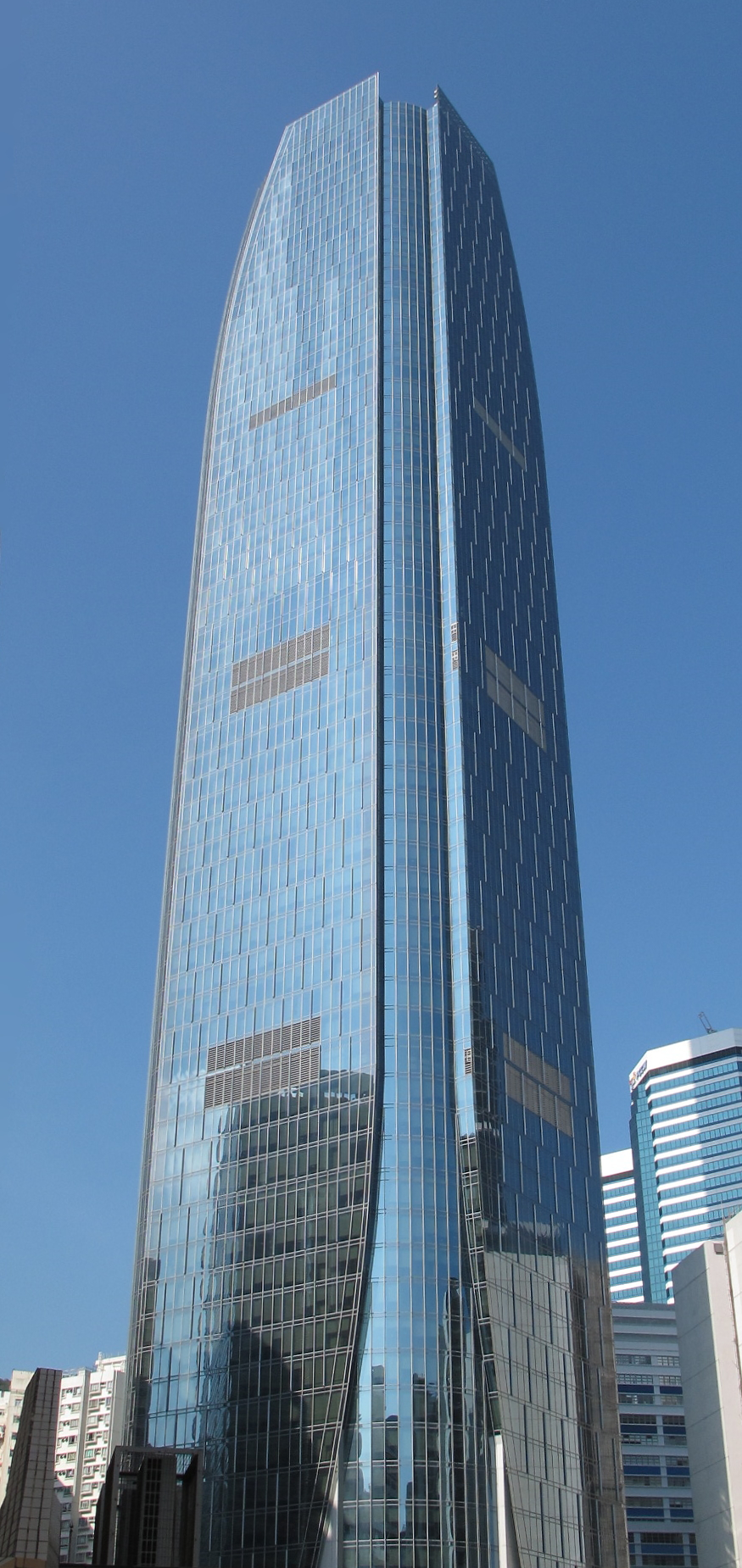

General information
- Status: Completed
- Type: Office
- Location: 18 Westlands Road, Hong Kong
- Coordinates: 22°17′09.7″N 114°12′48.0″E
- Construction started: 2006
- Completed: 2008
- Cost: HK$2,000,000,000

Height
- Architectural: 298 metres (978 ft)
- Top floor: 281.2 m (923 ft)

Technical details
- Floor count: 69 (plus 2 level of basement)
- Floor area: 144,426 m^{2} (1,554,590 sq ft)
- Lifts/elevators: 37

Design and construction
- Architect: Wong & Ouyang
- Developer: Swire Properties
- Main contractor: Gammon Construction

One Island East is a grade-A office. It is 69-storey. It is located at 18 Westlands Road, Quarry Bay, Hong Kong. It was completed in year 2008.

== Tenants ==
- 2－3/F: Accenture
- 4 & 67/F: Neo Derm
- 4/F: Amgen (Room 407-12)
- 5/F: CLSA
- 6－7/F: American International Group (AIG)
- 8/F: Mandarin Oriental Hotel Group
- 10－13/F及15－16/F: DBS Bank
- 17/F, 32/F: Reed Smith Richards Butler
- 22/F: Allied World Assurance
- 23/F: The Executive Centre
- 24/F: Viatris (Room 2401-07及12), La Prairie (Room 2408-11)
- 25－26/F: Zurich Insurance Group
- 27/F: Cushman & Wakefield
- 28 & 59/F: Prudential plc
- 29－31/F: Aedas
- 31/F: City Chamber Orchestra of Hong Kong
- 32/F: SWIFT (Room 3201－09)
- 34/F: Aon Corporation
- 37/F: PUBLIC
- 38/F, 45－48/F & 50－54/F: Securities and Futures Commission (38/F as reception), Investor Compensation Company Limited, Investor and Financial Education Council
- 39/F: AllianceBernstein
- 40/F: H&H International Holdings Limited
- 41/F: Accenture (Room 4103-10), Capgemini (Room 4101－02, 4111－12)
- 42/F: Appleby (Room 4201－03), Tiffany & Co (Room 4208)
- 43/F: Covestro
- 44/F: Ince & Co (Room 4404－10)
- 55 & 56/F: Freshfields Bruckhaus Deringer
- 57/F: AXA Investment Managers
- 58/F: Aegon
- 60/F: Euronext (Room 6020)
- 60/F: Telefonaktiebolaget L. M. Ericsson
- 61/F: Chanel Hong Kong Limited
- 63/F: Citrix Systems, Inc., TaubmanAsia (Room 6311)
- 64－65/F: Swire Properties
- 67/F: Neo Derm

=== FWD Tower ===
FWD Tower
- 富衛中心
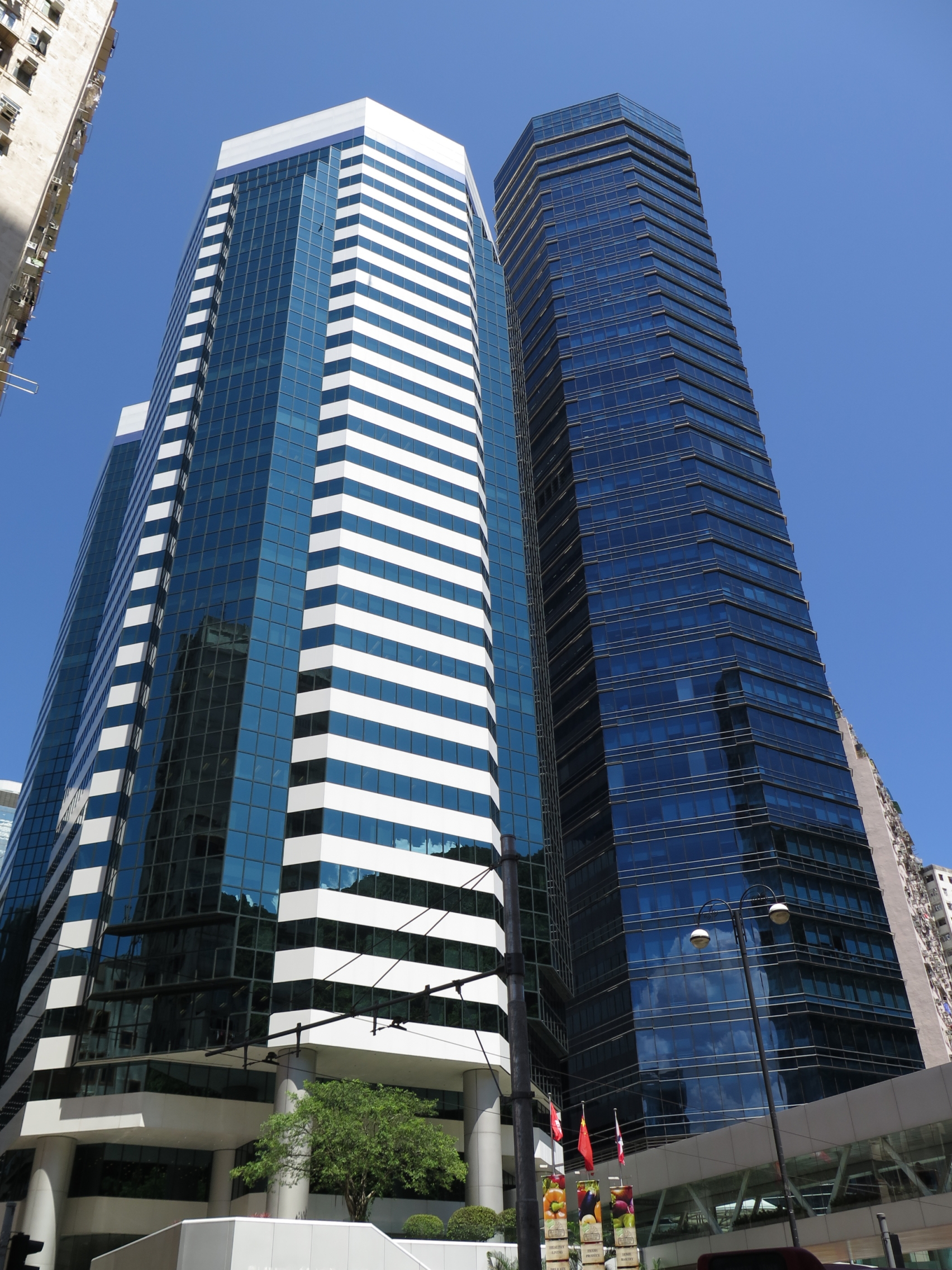
- Devon House (Left)
- Former names: Devon House（德宏大廈）

General information
- Status: Completed
- Type: Office
- Location: 979 King's Road, Hong Kong
- Coordinates: 22°17′14″N 114°12′40″E
- Completed: 1993

Height
- Architectural: 298 metres (978 ft)
- Top floor: 29

Technical details
- Floor count: 29
- Floor area: 15,000 m^{2} (160,000 sq ft)
- Lifts/elevators: 16 Passenger Lift + 3 Cargo Lift
- Grounds: 27,500 sq ft (2,550 m^{2})

Design and construction
- Architect: Wong & Ouyang
- Developer: Swire Properties
- Main contractor: Gammon Construction

Other information
- Parking: Yes

FWD Tower (formerly known as Devon House; 1993) is located at 979 King's Road, Quarry Bay, Hong Kong. Devon House is a grade A office with 29 floors. Major tenants include: FWD Group, Kinmen Building, Philip Morris, China Airlines, Jardine, Dairy Farm International and other rentals.

- 3, 5, 7-8, 11 / F: Dairy Farm International Holdings
- 4, 15, 17, 18, 20, 21 / F: CITIC Bank International
- 16 / F: Godiva
- 19 / F: Mitsubishi Tokyo Financial Group (Hong Kong)
- 23-24 / F: Philip Morris Asia Group Limited
- 25/ F: Jardine, Matheson, & Co.
- 27 / F: China Airlines Hong Kong
- 29 / F: Schindler Lifts Hong Kong

=== Dorset House ===
Dorset House
- 多盛大廈
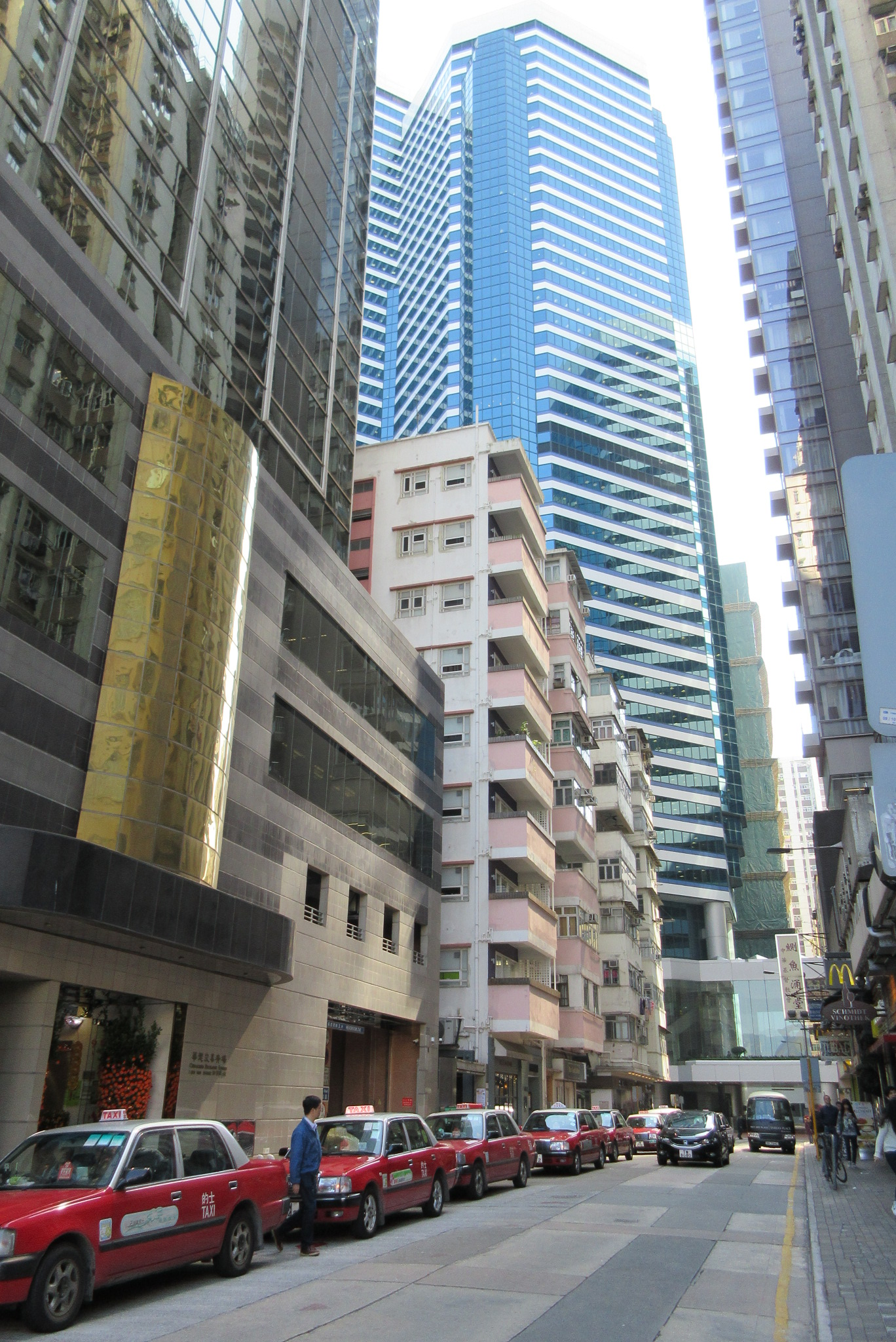

General information
- Status: Completed
- Type: Office
- Location: 979 King's Road, Hong Kong
- Coordinates: 22°17′12″N 114°12′44″E
- Completed: 1994

Height
- Architectural: 298 metres (978 ft)

Technical details
- Floor count: 34
- Floor area: 47,000 m^{2} (510,000 sq ft)
- Grounds: 610,000 sq ft (57,000 m^{2})

Design and construction
- Architect: Wong & Ouyang
- Developer: Swire Properties
- Main contractor: Gammon Construction

Dorset House (1994) is located at 979 King's Road, Quarry Bay, Hong Kong. It provides 610,000 square feet (57,000 square meter). It also houses Butterfield's, a private members club managed by the Peninsula Group that offers gourmet dining, private function space, extensive meeting and banqueting facilities, and fitness and health facilities. Headroom is approximately 2.7m and 34 floors in total. Major tenants include McDonald's, LVMH, AC Nielsen, Jones Lang LaSalle, Wang Ouyang (Hong Kong) and the British Telecom and other rental

Floor	Tenant
6	ISS A/S
9	Balenciaga Asia Pacific Limited; Leigh & Orange Ltd.
10	The Nielsen Company Limited (Hong Kong)
14	Precision engineering; Fendi Asia Pacific Limited
14, 23	Royal Canin Hong Kong Limited
16	LVMH Asia Pacific Limited; Guardian Asia Pacific Limited
17	Jones Lang LaSalle Limited
19	Moët Hennessy Hong Kong Limited
20, 22	Louis Vuitton Pacific Limited
22	Berluti Asia Pacific
23	Wrigley Asia Pacific Limited Mars Foods Incorporate Hong Kong Limited
27	Wong Ouyang Architect Office
31	Gravitas Ventures
31, 35-36	McDonald's Hong Kong
34	Christian Dior Far East Limited
38	British Telecom

=== Cambridge House ===
Cambridge House
- 康橋大廈
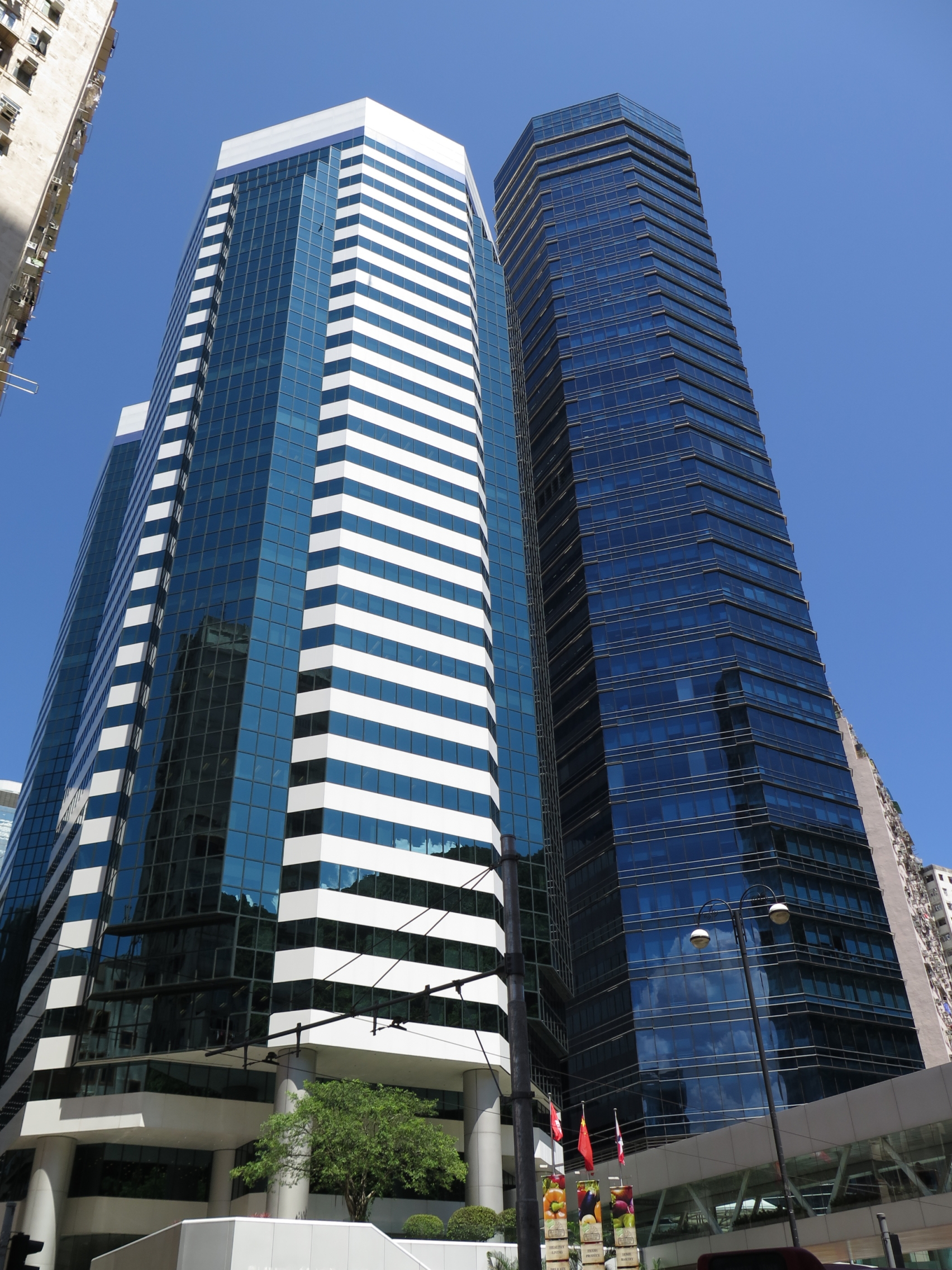
- Cambridge House (Right)

General information
- Location: 979 King's Road, Hong Kong
- Opened: 2003

Cambridge House (formerly Po Yuan House) is located at 979 King's Road, Quarry Bay, Hong Kong. It consists of 36-storey office. Major tenants include Guerlain, TBWA and Campbell Soup.

- 16 / F: TBWA Worldwide
- 23 / F: BSI Pacific Limited
- 25 / F: Campbell Soup Company

Kjeldsens

- 31 / F: Vodafone Hong Kong
- 35 / F: Galderma (Rm 3501-02)
- 35 / F: LANXESS Hong Kong (Rm 3503-04)

=== Lincoln House ===
Lincoln House (1998): formerly known as the South China Morning Post building, is located at 979 King's Road, Quarry Bay, Hong Kong. It consists of 36-storey office. Major tenants include Wyeth Nutrition, The Coca-Cola Company, Lenovo, Benoy and Gucci. Lincoln House is sited at 979 King's Road, Taikoo Place. 21 floors in total, 1,000 square metres (10,800 sq ft) and 2.6 meter for headroom.

Floor	Tenants
3, 15	ANZ HK
5	Benoy Architects
9	Raffles Medical Group; Heineken HK (Rm 903-05)
10	Fujitsu HK
17	BNP Paribas Asset Management
20	CITIC Telecom
22-23	Lenovo HK

=== PCCW Tower ===
PCCW Tower
- 電訊盈科中心
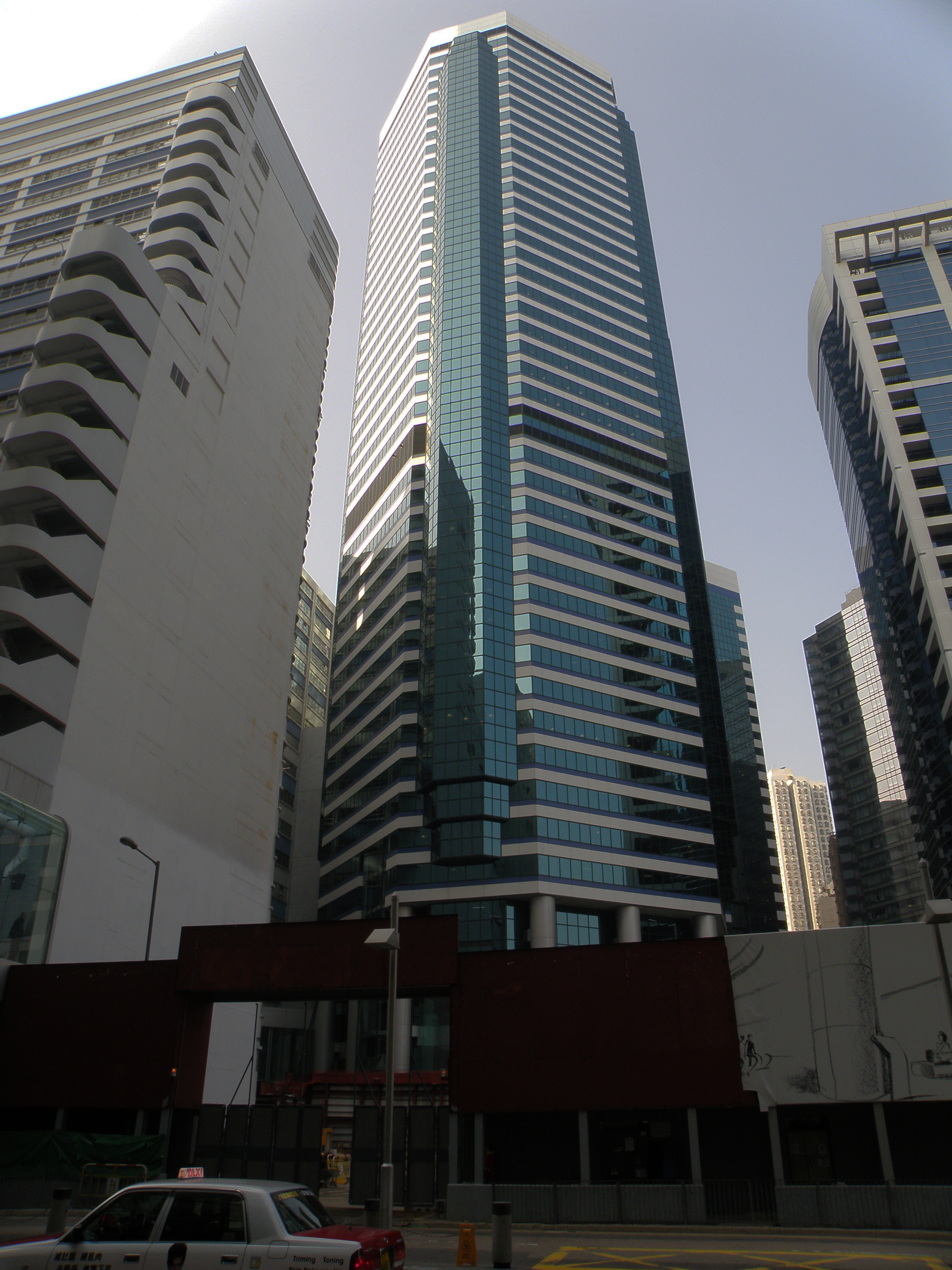

General information
- Status: Completed
- Type: Office
- Location: 979 King's Road, Hong Kong
- Coordinates: 22°17′13″N 114°12′44″E
- Completed: 1994

Height
- Architectural: 298 metres (978 ft)

Technical details
- Floor count: 36
- Floor area: 16,000 m^{2} (170,000 sq ft)
- Grounds: 620,000 sq ft (58,000 sqm)

Design and construction
- Architect: Wong & Ouyang
- Developer: Swire Properties
- Main contractor: Gammon Construction

PCCW Tower (1994) is located at 979 King's Road, Quarry Bay, Hong Kong. It consists of 36-storey office. Major tenants include BNP, IBM, WPP and PCCW.

Floor	Tenants
9	Lockton Companies Hong Kong
17-18	HKT Limited Consumer Group
10, 17	IBM China
20, 22	BNP Paribas
23, 27-29	HKT Limited
14, 32-34	PCCW Global Limited
36	Maxus; Hill & Knowlton Asia Pacific Limited
36-37	MediaCom
36, 38	J. Walter ThompsonCompany Limited
6, 32, 40	CSL Mobile Limited

=== Oxford House (1999) ===
Oxford House
- 濠豐大廈
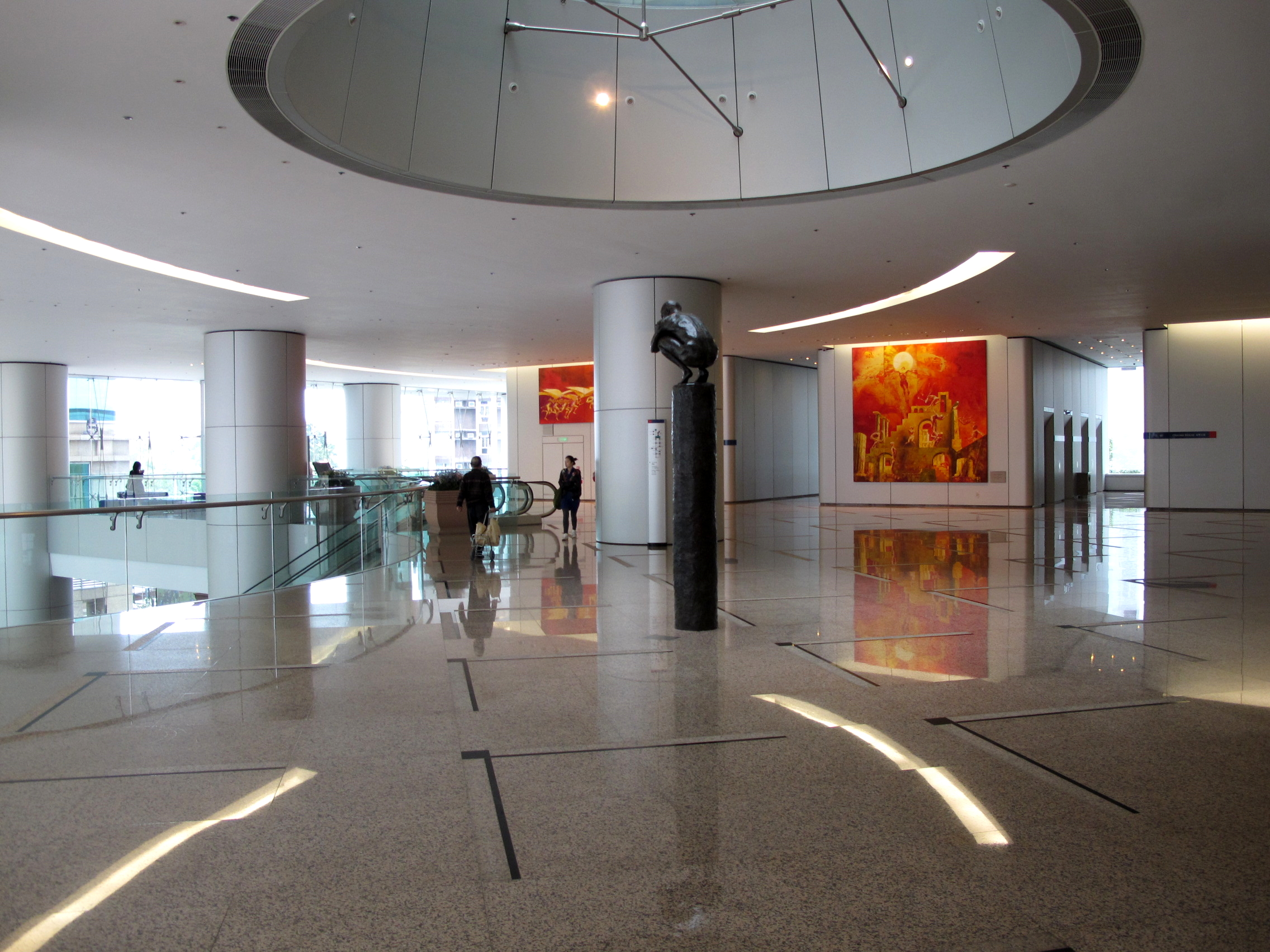

General information
- Status: Completed
- Type: Office
- Location: 979 King's Road, Hong Kong
- Coordinates: 22°17′13″N 114°12′49″E
- Completed: 1999

Height
- Architectural: 298 metres (978 ft)

Technical details
- Floor count: 36
- Floor area: 47,000 m^{2} (510,000 sq ft)

Design and construction
- Architect: Wong & Ouyang
- Developer: Swire Properties
- Main contractor: Gammon Construction

Oxford House, (formerly Toppan Building), is located at 979 King's Road, Quarry Bay, Hong Kong. It is a grade-A office which consists of 36-storey office AND EACH TALL HALL IS 2.57 METER HILL. Major tenants include Oxford University Press, Turner Broadcasting Company, Bulgari, Dell, Interpublic Group, JCDecaux, KPMG, LVMH, QBE, and KPMG.

Floor	Tenants
3	Quality Healthcare Asia Pacific Regional
4	Dimension Data China/hk Limited
6	Golin
14	Bayer Healthcare
17	EMC Computer Systems (FE) Ltd
24	LVMH Watch & Jewelry HK Limited
25	Bulgari Asia Pacific
17, 27	Baxter International, Baxter Healthcare
27	LG Hong Kong
15, 20, 28	KPMG (28 / F-Professional Training Center)
30	Metlife Asia Pacific ltd; Aspern Asia
37	TIME

=== Taikoo Place Apartments (2015) ===
Taikoo Place Apartments
- 太古坊栢舍
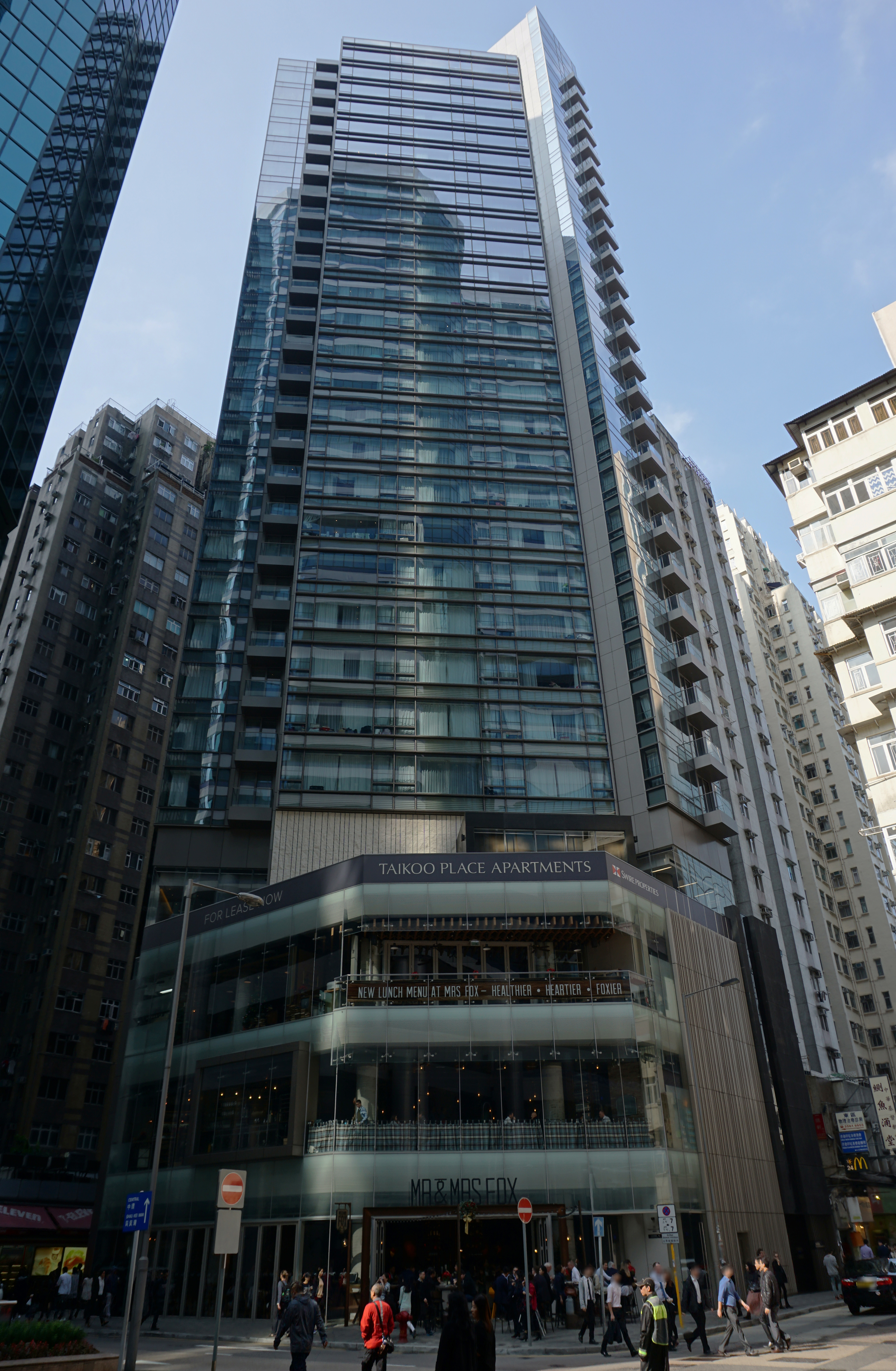

General information
- Status: Completed
- Type: Office
- Location: 23 Tong Chong Street, Hong Kong
- Coordinates: 22°17′08.8″N 114°12′40.1″E
- Completed: 2015

Height
- Architectural: 298 metres (978 ft)

Technical details
- Floor count: 30
- Floor area: 47,000 m^{2} (510,000 sq ft)

Design and construction
- Architect: Wong & Ouyang
- Developer: Swire Properties
- Main contractor: Gammon Construction

Taikoo Place Apartments is located at 23 Tong Chong Street and opened at mid-2015. Together the 111 served residences occupied the 30 floors.

Four choices are available, such as studio (~480 sq ft.), single bedroom (~650sq ft.), double bedroom (~1220sq ft.), and penthouses (either 1220 or 1610 sq ft.)

The bar Mr. and Ms. Fox are on the Ground floor Formerly 23, Tong Chong Street, Quarry Bay, 28 floors above.

=== Westlands Centre ===
- 17-18 / F: Dell
- 30-40 / F: Turner Broadcasting Company Asia Pacific Headquarters (40 / F - CNN Hong Kong Broadcasting Center).

=== Berkshire House ===
(Formerly known as the Daxingxing Commercial Center and Car Service Center) (1998): It is a grade A office with 25 floors, providing 381,000 square feet (or 35,400 square meters).

=== One Taikoo Place ===
One Taikoo Place was completed in September 2018. It is the first of two new Grade-A office towers in the Taikoo Place redevelopment project. One Taikoo Place has 48 storeys, including 41 floors of triple Grade-A office space. It has an average floor size of 21,000 sq ft and a gross floor area of 1 million sq ft. Designed by Wong & Ouyang (HK) Ltd, the tower features 3-metre-wide curtain wall window panels, with each floor designed to provide an abundance of natural light and offer panoramic views of Victoria Harbour. The office tower has been built to the highest sustainability standards by Arup, achieving Pre-certified Platinum for LEED BD+C: Core and Shell Version 2009, and Provisional Platinum for BEAM Plus New Buildings Version 1.2 green building standards. The Building is also recognized as the first AI & Data-driven Building in Hong Kong by implementing Arup Neuron Digital Platform to optimize all the operation data inside the building.

== Former buildings ==
=== Warwick House (1979) ===
Kang and Mansion and the domain building composed of 2B site, will be reconstructed into a 42-storey 3-storey library of commercial buildings, called Taikoo Square two Two Taikoo Place, as well as a 69,000 square foot garden square, Taikoo Square and Taikoo Garden. The gross floor of the commercial building is about 983,000 square feet and is expected to be completed in 2021.

- Cornwall House (1984) (Demolition): Multi-purpose Art Venue ArtisTree is located on the first floor of this building [4].

=== Somerset House (1988) ===
- It has been demolished and will be rebuilt into a 48-storey Grade 1 building with a Grade 1 storey building called One Taikoo Place with a gross floor area of approximately 102.1 10,000 square feet, is expected to be transferred in 2018. [5]

== Future buildings ==
Swire Properties announced HKD$15 billion will be spent on redeveloping the Taikoo Park (i.e. Via Fiori), Taikoo Place Phase 1 (completed in September 2018) and Phase 2 (Complete in 2021). Architects and design firms including Gustafson Porter and Wong & Ouyang (HK) Ltd. Hugh Sutton Associates will be in charge of the new elevated walkway system.

== Recreation, parks, and energy-saving initiatives ==
Taikoo Place is next to Taikoo Park and Quarry Bay Park. An extra 69,000 square feet of open landscaped gardens will be provided in the coming years.

Besides, biodiesel tri-generation and adsorption chiller energy was adopted in order to save up to 2% of building energy, methods include increasing both the efficiency of electricity and space cooling by chilled water. This reduces the greenhouse effect within the office complex.

The rooftop is planted so that 75% of demolition waste is then diverted from landfills.

== Events and exhibitions ==
Cornwall House provides 10,000 square feet of area for business events. Topics includes Gender equality and GPS navigation software. A forum called "blueprint Labs" for start-up is introduced in 2016.

== Paintings and sculptures ==
External charters and membership provide awards that encourage designers to present their artwork. About 300 personnel outside the company, including NGOs such as Hong Kong Blind Union, Chung Ying Theatre, and Hong Kong Youth Arts Foundation will also attend those 100 briefing on feedbacks from their staff.

== Leisure and entertainment ==
The Taikoo Place is next to Cityplaza, a grade A shopping mall with ice skating rink, cinema and five-star hotel EAST, Hong Kong. The theme of the complex is to "Live Happy".

== Transportations ==
Mass Transit Railway is seen as a catalyst in speeding up the movement of the working class.

Drop off areas is available in the entrance of One Island East, Devon House, Oxford House and Tong Chong Street. Island Eastern Corridor and Eastern Harbour Crossing also connects Taikoo Place with East Kowloon, Central, Hong Kong and Hong Kong International Airport. MTR, tram, bus, and minibus are also available on particular time slots.

== Gallery ==
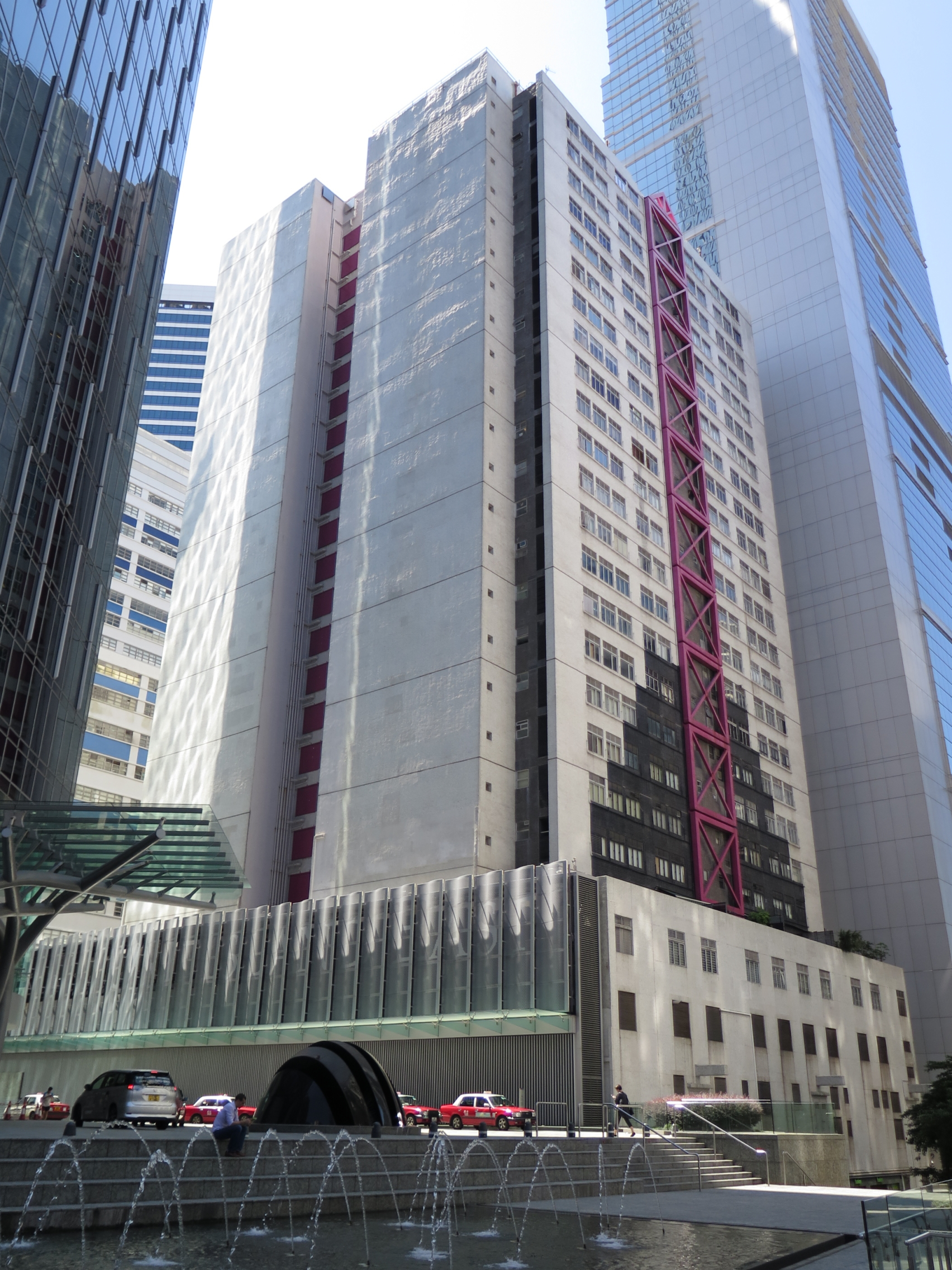
Westlands Centre

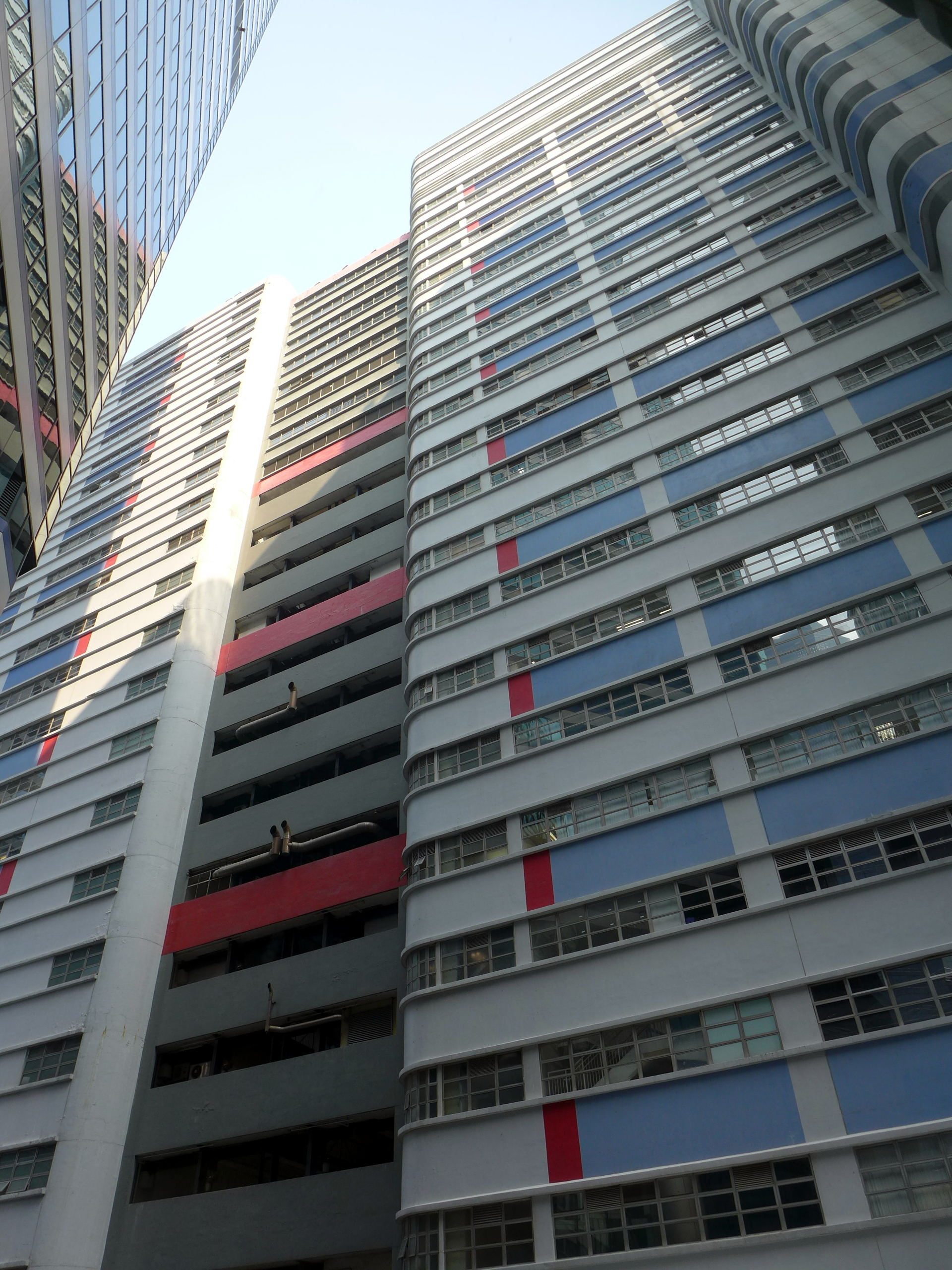
Somerset House

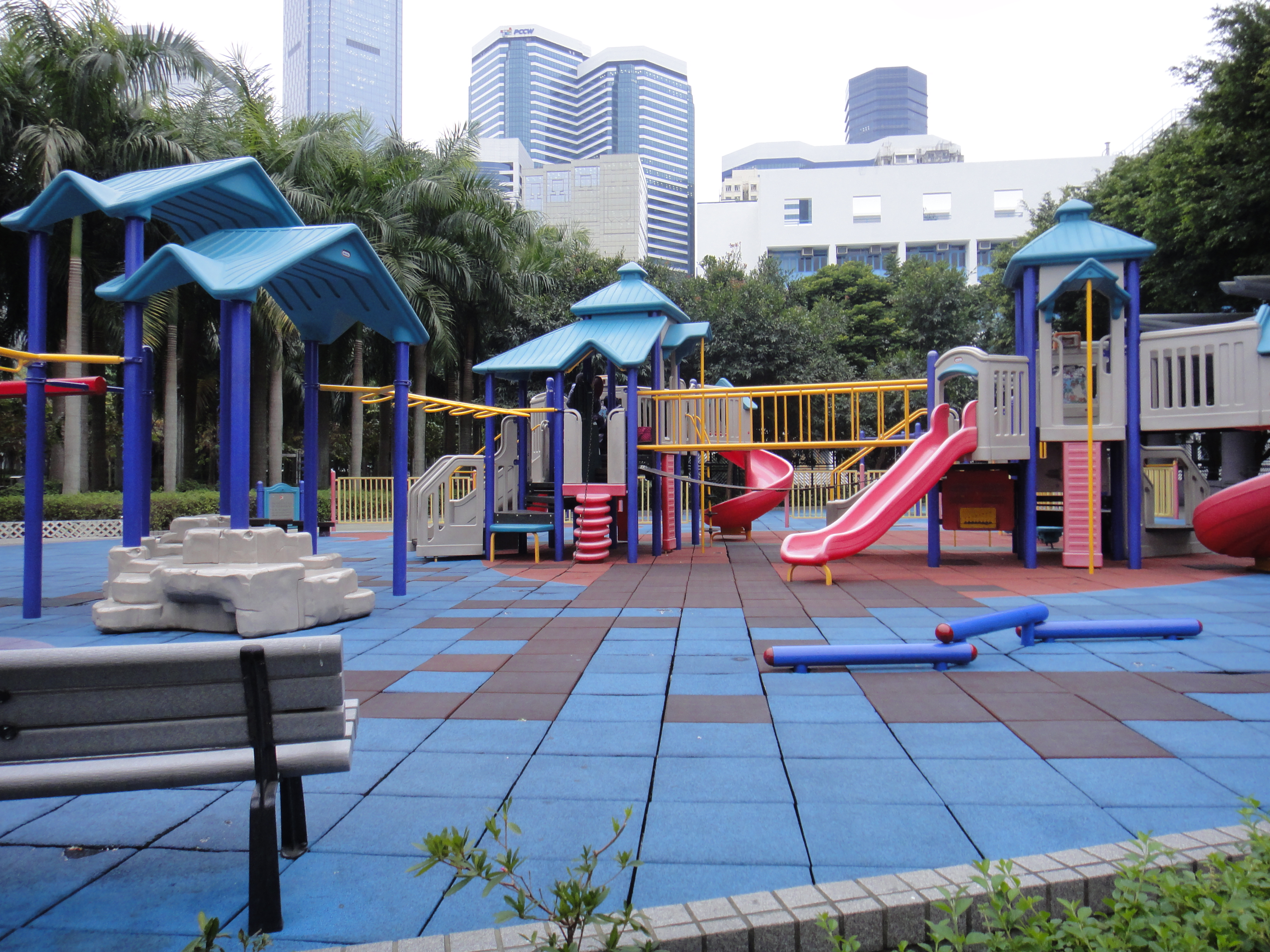
Quarry Bay Park

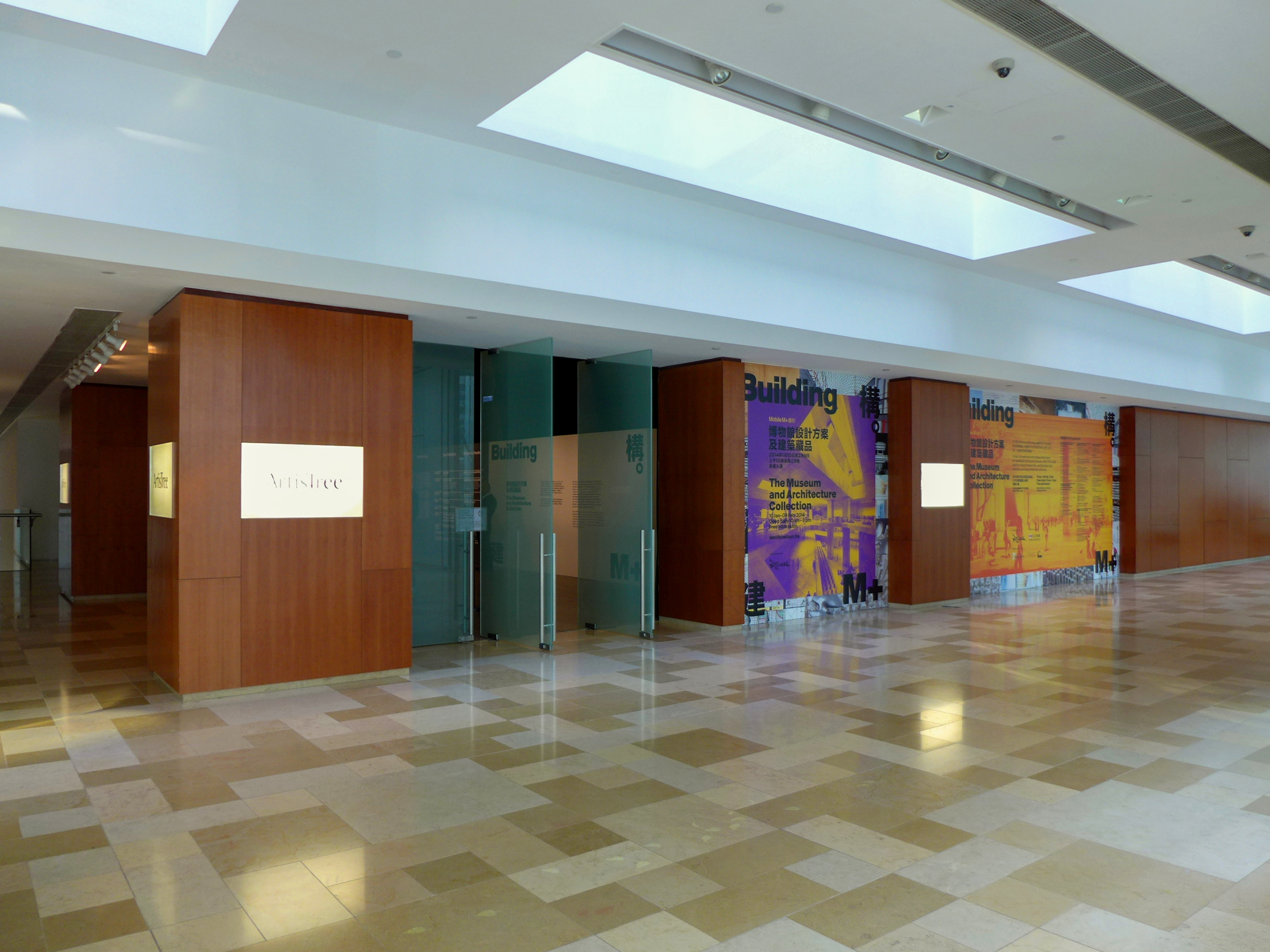
ArtisTree Exhibition Center

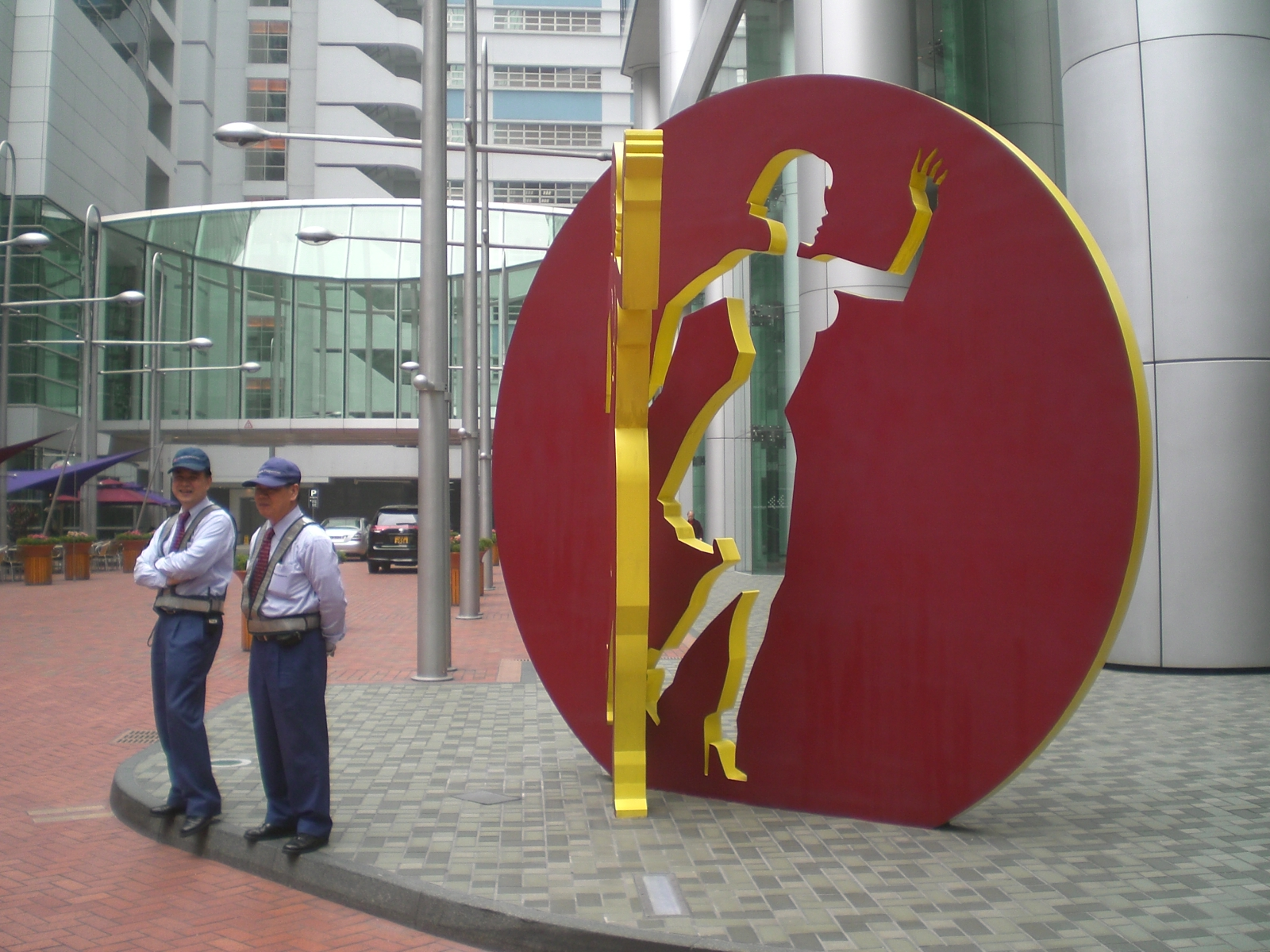
"Make A Difference"

== See also ==
- Quarry Bay
- One Island East
- Cityplaza
- Pacific Place
- List of tallest buildings in Hong Kong
