= Spigurnel =

Spigurnel or Spigurnell may refer to:

- Henry Spigurnel (c. 1261/3–1328), English judge: Justice of the King's Bench
- Ralph de Spigurnell (c. 1317-1373), English knight: Warden of the Cinque Ports
- William Spigurnell (fl. 1390s–1420s), English priest: Canon of Windsor and Archdeacon of Colchester
