= Lockton (surname) =

Lockton is a surname. Notable people with the surname include:

- David Lockton (born 1937), American entrepreneur
- David M. Lockton, American banker
- Joan Lockton (1903–?), British actress
- John Lockton (1892–1972), English sportsman
