= John Walcot (Shropshire MP) =

English politician, MP for Shropshire (17th century)

Member of the House of Commons

Personal details
- Born: 1624
- Died: 1702 (aged 77–78)
- Party: Tory
- Spouse(s): Elizabeth Lucy (m. 1653–1655), Elizabeth Clarke (m. 1657)
- Children: 15
- Education: Exeter College, Oxford

John Walcot (1624–1702), of Walcot, Shropshire and Beguildy, Radnorshire was an English landowner and politician who sat in the House of Commons in the 17th century, representing Shropshire.

John Walcot was baptized on 24 June 1624, the eldest son of Humphrey and Anne (née Docwra) Walcot. His younger brother was English judge and politician Thomas Walcot. He attended Exeter College, Oxford and entered the Middle Temple in 1641.

Walcot married twice. Around 1653, he married Elizabeth Lucy, with whom he had two sons, both of whom Walcot survived. Elizabeth died in 1655. Two years later, on 26 May 1657, Walcot married Elizabeth Clarke, with whom he had six sons and seven daughters.

Walcot died in 1702.
