= Hang Seng Bank Headquarters Building =

Skyscraper in Central, Hong Kong

Coordinates: 22.2846°N 114.1561°E

- 恒生銀行總行大廈
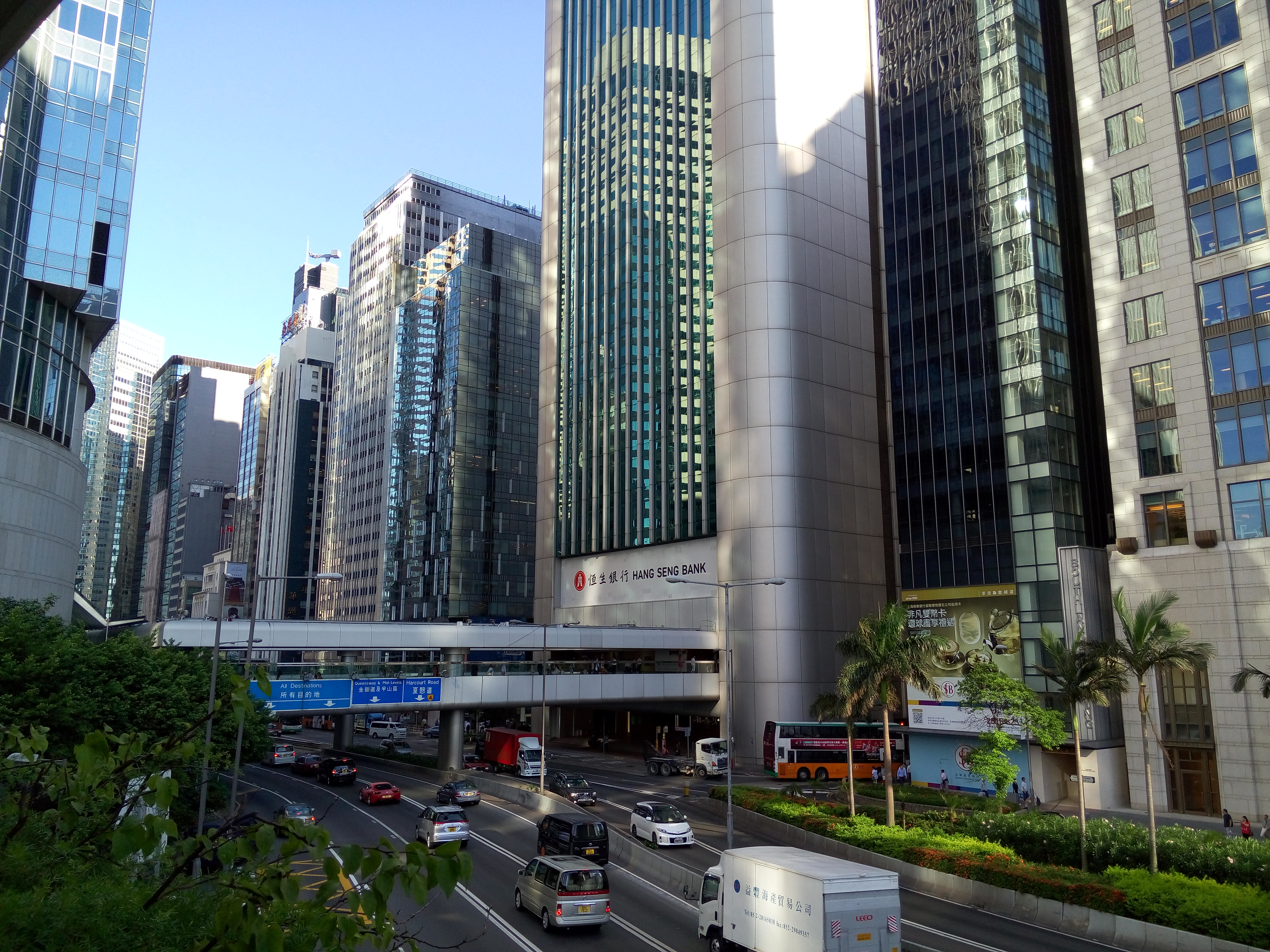
- Tower viewed from Connaught Road
- Interactive map of the Hang Seng Bank Headquarters Building area

General information
- Status: Completed
- Type: Office
- Location: Victoria, Hong Kong, 83 Des Voeux Road Central, Central
- Opened: 1991; 35 years ago
- Cost: $1.84 billion

Height
- Height: 137 metres (449 ft)

Technical details
- Floor count: 27

Design and construction
- Architect: Wong & Ouyang

Hang Seng Bank Headquarters Building
- Traditional Chinese: 恒生銀行總行大廈
- Simplified Chinese: 恒生银行总行大厦
Transcriptions
Standard Mandarin
- Hanyu Pinyin: Héng Shēng Yínháng Zǒng Háng Dàshà
Yue: Cantonese
- Yale Romanization: Hàhng sāng ngàhn hòhng júng hòhng daaih haah
- Jyutping: Hang4 sang1 ngan4 hong4 zung2 hong4 daai6 haa6

The Hang Seng Bank New Headquarters Building is a skyscraper at No. 83 Des Voeux Road Central, Central, Hong Kong. It houses the headquarters of the Hang Seng Bank.

== History ==
The former Central Fire Station previously stood on the site. After the station was demolished, the land was sold on 29 May 1987 to Hang Seng Bank for $840 million. At $37,197 per square foot, the site was Hong Kong's most expensive when it was sold.

The new bank headquarters was designed by Wong & Ouyang (HK) Ltd. It cost $1.84 billion and opened in 1991. The large retail bank at the bottom of the tower had counters extending more than 190 metres, with positions for more than 150 tellers. The main feature of this banking hall is a stainless steel etched mural based on A City of Cathay, a famous Chinese scroll depicting townspeople going about their daily lives.

The building replaced 77 Des Voeux Road Central as the headquarters of Hang Seng Bank, which in turn replaced an earlier headquarters at 163-165 Queen's Road Central.

== Description ==
Structurally, the building is supported by two concrete service cores at the eastern and western edges of the site, which can be clearly seen in the tower's external expression. Post-tensioned floor beams span more than 30 metres between the cores, producing completely column-free floor plates. This design also means that the east and west faces of the tower are windowless, while the north and south faces have large windows.

When the building was completed, occupants enjoyed unobstructed views of Victoria Harbour, the cross-harbour vehicular ferry pier and its marshalling area being located on the foreshore before it. Under the Airport Core Programme, land was reclaimed from the harbour directly in front of the building, and the view has largely been obstructed by the International Finance Centre (IFC).

A dual-footbridge runs through the building, linking it to IFC (to the north) and the Central Market to the south. This places the tower at a prominent position within the Central Elevated Walkway system.

== Transport ==
The Hong Kong Tramways runs directly in front of the building on Des Voeux Road, along with numerous bus routes. Hong Kong station is located on the opposite side of Connaught Road beneath the IFC, while Central station is a 230-metre walk away. The Central Ferry Piers are about 400 metres away via the footbridge network.
