= Thomas Bacon (judge) =

English judge

Thomas Bacon (fl. 1336) was an English judge, being the Justice of the Common Pleas. He held the post from 30 December 1329 to 28 January 1332. He left to become a Justice of the King's Bench.
