= Thomas Walcot =

English judge and politician

Sir Thomas Walcot SL (6 August 1629 – 6 September 1685) was an English judge and politician.

== Family ==
Thomas Walcot, born 6 August 1629, was the second son of Humphrey Walcot (1586-1650) and his wife Anne Docwra (d.1675), whose mother, Jane (née Peryam) Docwra, was the daughter of Sir William Peryam. Walcot had an elder brother, John, and a younger brother, William.

== Career ==
Walcot entered Trinity College, Cambridge on 16 May 1646, became a member of the Middle Temple on 12 November 1647, and was called to the Bar there on 25 November 1653. On 15 February 1662 he became Attorney-General of Denbighshire and Montgomeryshire, and in April 1676 a Justice of the North Wales circuit. On 3 September 1679 he was elected Member of Parliament for Ludlow, becoming a Serjeant-at-Law in May 1680 and a Justice of the King's Bench on 22 October 1683, a position he held until his death on 6 September 1685.

== Marriage and issue ==
On 10 December 1663, Walcot married Mary Littleton (d. 1695), the daughter of Sir Adam Littleton of Stoke St. Milborough, Shropshire. Their only child, Thomas Walcot, died in infancy.
