= Adam Stonegrave =

Adam Stonegrave (fl. 1341–1342) was a Justice of the Common Pleas between 28 October 1341 and 10 January 1342 and a Justice of the King's Bench in 1342.
