= Wong & Ouyang =

Architectural and engineering company in Hong Kong

Wong & Ouyang (HK) Ltd.
- Industry: Architecture
- Founded: 1983
- Headquarters: Quarry Bay, Hong Kong, and China (Additional offices in Shanghai and Guangzhou)
- Services: Architecture, Interior Design, Urban Design and Master Planning
- Website: www.wongouyang.com

Wong & Ouyang
- Traditional Chinese: 王歐陽（香港）有限公司
- Simplified Chinese: 王欧阳（香港）有限公司
Transcriptions
Standard Mandarin
- Hanyu Pinyin: Wáng Ōuyáng (Xiānggǎng) Yǒuxiàngōngsī
Yue: Cantonese
- Jyutping: wong4 au1 joeng4 (hoeng1 gong2) jau5 haan6 gung1 si1

Wong & Ouyang (HK) Ltd. (Chinese: 王歐陽（香港）有限公司) is an architectural and engineering practice based in Hong Kong, with branch offices in Shanghai and Guangzhou.

Its head office is in Taikoo Place, Quarry Bay, and it maintains an office in Shanghai.

== History ==
The company, incorporated in 1983, was founded as Wong, Ng and Associates in 1957, which became Wong, Ng, Ouyang and Associates in 1964, and Wong and Ouyang and Associates in 1972.

In June 2024, Wong & Ouyang was among ten companies to receive the (Building and Construction Information) BCI Asia Top 10 Architects Award.

== Major projects ==
Metrobank Center, Bonifacio Global City (2017)

=== Culture ===
- Art in Station Architecture, HKU Centennial Wall (2014)
- The Hong Kong Pavilion at Shanghai Expo, Shanghai (2010)
- Hong Kong Convention and Exhibition Centre, Atrium Link Extension, Hong Kong (2009)
- Hong Kong Convention and Exhibition Centre Extension, Hong Kong (1997)

=== Civic ===
- West Kowloon Law Courts Building, Hong Kong (2017)
- Redevelopment of Departmental Quarters for Custom and Excise Department, Hong Kong (2012)
- Shun Lee Disciplined Services Quarters, Hong Kong (2001)
- Sheung Shui Slaughterhouse, Hong Kong (1999)

=== Education ===
- The Hang Seng University of Hong Kong (formerly Hang Seng Management College) Redevelopment, Hong Kong (2012-2015)
- The University of Hong Kong, The Centennial Campus and University Street, Hong Kong (2014)
- La Salle Primary School, Hong Kong (2005)
- Hong Kong Li Po Chun United World College, Hong Kong (1993)

=== Offices ===
- Two Taikoo Place, Hong Kong (under construction)
- One Taikoo Place, Hong Kong (2018)
- Lee Garden Three, Hong Kong (2018)
- One Island East, Hong Kong (2008)
- One Kowloon, Hong Kong (2007)
- Three Pacific Place, Hong Kong (2004)
- Taikoo Place Development, Hong Kong (1993-2003)
- Hang Seng Bank Headquarters Building, Hong Kong (1991)

=== Healthcare ===
- The Chinese Medicine Hospital & Government Chinese Medicine Testing Institute at TKO, Hong Kong (under construction)
- CUHK Medical Centre, Hong Kong (2020)
- Expansion of United Christian Hospital, Hong Kong (under construction)
- Caritas Medical Centre Phase II, Wai Ming Block, Hong Kong (2013)
- Prince of Wales Hospital, Main Clinical Block & Trauma Centre, Hong Kong (2011)
- Hong Kong Baptist Hospital, Redevelopment of Au Shue Hung Health Centre, Hong Kong (2008)
- Redevelopment of Hong Kong Sanatorium & Hospital, Hong Kong (2008)

=== Hospitality ===
- Hoiana Integrated Resorts, Hoi An, Vietnam (under construction)
- The Murray, Hong Kong (2018)
- Wynn Palace, Macau (2016)
- Galaxy Macau, Lot 1, Phase II, Macau (2015)
- Serviced Apartment at Cotai Strip Parcel 2, Macau (2009)
- The Upper House, Hong Kong (2009)
- Shangri-La Hotel and Office Development, Chengdu (2007)
- Beijing Shangri-La Hotel Phase III, Beijing (2007)
- Wynn Macau, Macau (2006)
- Langham Place Hotel, Hong Kong (2004)
- Grand Hyatt Hotel, Manila (2018)
- Hong Kong Gold Coast Hotel, Hong Kong (1992)
- Holiday Inn Surfers Paradise, Gold Coast, Australia (1985)
- Kowloon Shangri-La, Hong Kong (1981)

=== Mixed Use ===
- Metrobank Center, Bonifacio Global City, Taguig, Philippines (2017)
- Crystal Plaza, Shanghai (2018)
- HKRI Taikoo Hui, Shanghai (2017)
- Hangzhou Kerry Centre, Hangzhou (2017)
- Jing An Kerry Centre, Shanghai (2014)
- East Pacific International Centre, Shenzhen (2014)
- Onelink Walk, Guangzhou (2011)
- International Commerce Centre, Hong Kong (2011)
- Alphaland Southgate Tower, Manila, Philippines (2009)
- The Cullinan, Hong Kong (2008)
- Langham Place, Hong Kong (2004)
- Times Square, Hong Kong (1993)
- Wheelock Place (formerly Lane Crawford Place), Singapore (1993)
- Pacific Place, Hong Kong (1990)
- Nelson Square, Vancouver, Canada (1982)

=== Residential ===
- The Papillons, Hong Kong (2018)
- Parc City, Hong Kong (2018)
- Mount Nicholson, Hong Kong (2016)
- The Austin & Grand Austin, Hong Kong (2015)
- Primrose Hill, Hong Kong (2011)
- Bel-Air on the Peak, Hong Kong (2008)
- The Orchards, Hong Kong (2003)
- Sorrento, Hong Kong (2002)

=== Master Planning ===
- The University of Hong Kong, Main Campus and Centennial Campus Master Plan, Hong Kong
- Kwun Tong Town Centre, Hong Kong
- Union Square
- Tseung Kwan O Area 86, Hong Kong
