= Robert Baynard =

Robert Baynard (died 1331), was an English politician and judge.

Baynard was the son of Fulk Baynard. He was elected knight of the shire for Norfolk several times between 1289 and 1327, and had the custody of the county in 1311–12. In January and July 1313 he was summoned to parliament, and at the accession of Edward III was made a Justice of the King's Bench on 9 March 1327.
