= One Island East =

Skyscraper in Quarry Bay, Hong Kong

- 港島東中心
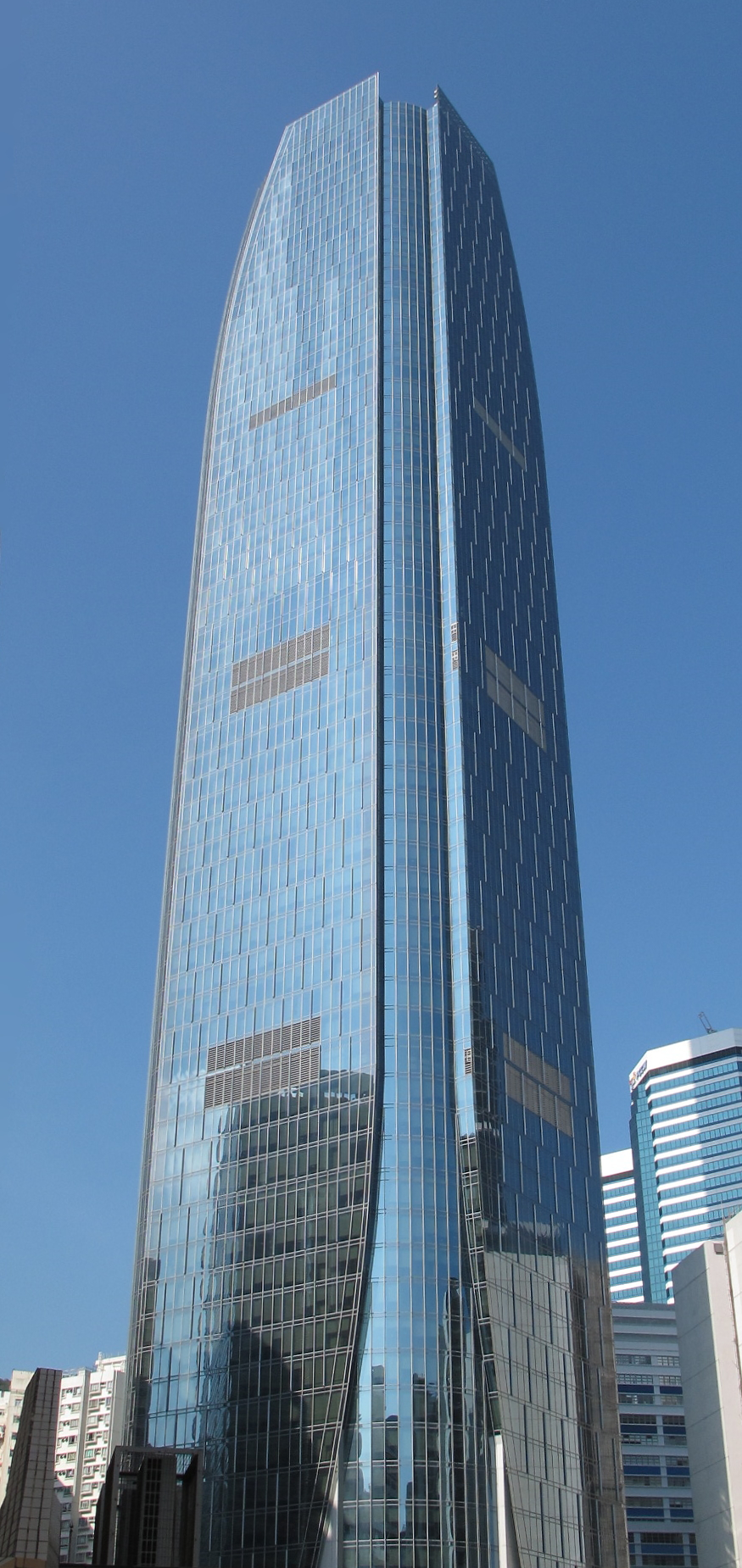
- Interactive map of the One Island East area

General information
- Status: Completed
- Type: Office
- Location: 18 Westlands Road, Tai Koo Shing, Quarry Bay, Hong Kong
- Coordinates: 22°17′09.8″N 114°12′48.1″E
- Construction started: 2006; 20 years ago
- Completed: 2008; 18 years ago
- Cost: HK$2,000,000,000

Height
- Architectural: 298 metres (978 ft)
- Top floor: 281.2 m (923 ft)

Technical details
- Floor count: 69 (plus 2 level of basement)
- Floor area: 144,426 m^{2} (1,554,590 sq ft)
- Lifts/elevators: 37

Design and construction
- Architect: Wong & Ouyang
- Developer: Swire Properties
- Main contractor: Gammon Construction

One Island East
- Traditional Chinese: 港島東中心
- Simplified Chinese: 港岛东中心
- Literal meaning: Hong Kong Island East Centre
Transcriptions
Standard Mandarin
- Hanyu Pinyin: Gǎngdǎo Dōng Zhōngxīn
Yue: Cantonese
- Yale Romanization: Góng dóu dūng jūng sām
- Jyutping: Gong2 dou2 dung1 zung1 sam1

One Island East is a skyscraper in Taikoo Place, Quarry Bay, Hong Kong Island, Hong Kong.

== Overview ==
The skyscraper is a commercial office building, rising 298.35 m (979 ft) and has 69 storeys plus two levels of basement. There is a sky lobby on the 37th and 38th floors. In addition, there are 28 high-speed passenger lifts, six high-speed shuttle lifts between Main (G - 1/F) and Sky (37 - 38/F) lobbies, one passenger lift between the main lobby and basement carpark and two service lifts.

One Island East was built under the first use of the Land (Compulsory Sale for Redevelopment) Ordinance (Cap 545), exercised by Swire in 2000. Part of the site was previously occupied by Melbourne Industrial Building (23-floor industrial building demolished 2005) and Aik San Factory Building (22-floor industrial building demolished 2005) which were acquired by the developer in 2002 and 2001 respectively. The main contractor was Gammon Construction.

== Tenants ==
- 2–3/F: Accenture
- 4 & 67/F: Neo Derm
- 4/F: Amgen (Room 407–12)
- 5/F: CLSA
- 6–7/F: American International Group (AIG)
- 8/F: Mandarin Oriental Hotel Group
- 10–13/F &15–16/F: DBS Bank
- 17/F, 32/F: Reed Smith Richards Butler
- 22/F: Allied World Assurance
- 23/F: The Executive Centre
- 24/F: Viatris (Room 2401–07及12), La Prairie (Room 2408–11)
- 25–26/F: Zurich Insurance Group
- 27/F: Cushman & Wakefield
- 28 & 59/F: Prudential plc
- 29–31/F: Aedas
- 31/F: City Chamber Orchestra of Hong Kong
- 32/F: SWIFT (Room 3201–09)
- 34/F: Aon Corporation
- 37/F: PUBLIC
- 38/F, 45–48/F & 50–54/F: Securities and Futures Commission (38/F as reception), Investor Compensation Company Limited, Investor and Financial Education Council
- 39/F: AllianceBernstein
- 40/F: H&H International Holdings Limited
- 41/F: Accenture (Room 4103–10), Capgemini (Room 4101–02, 4111–12)
- 42/F: Appleby (Room 4201–03), Tiffany & Co (Room 4208)
- 43/F: Covestro
- 44/F: Ince & Co (Room 4404–10)
- 55 & 56/F: Freshfields
- 57/F: AXA Investment Managers
- 58/F: Aegon
- 60/F: Euronext (Room 6020)
- 60/F: Telefonaktiebolaget L. M. Ericsson
- 61/F: Chanel Hong Kong Limited
- 63/F: Citrix Systems, Inc., TaubmanAsia (Room 6311)
- 64–65/F: Swire Properties
- 67/F: Neo Derm

== 2008 Tropical Storm Kammuri ==
On 7 August 2008, within two hours of the hoisting of strong wind signal No.8 due to tropical storm Kammuri, some window panes of One Island East were shattered, sending shards of glass across the street and damaging the windows of four flats at Westlands Court. There were no injuries.

== Gallery ==
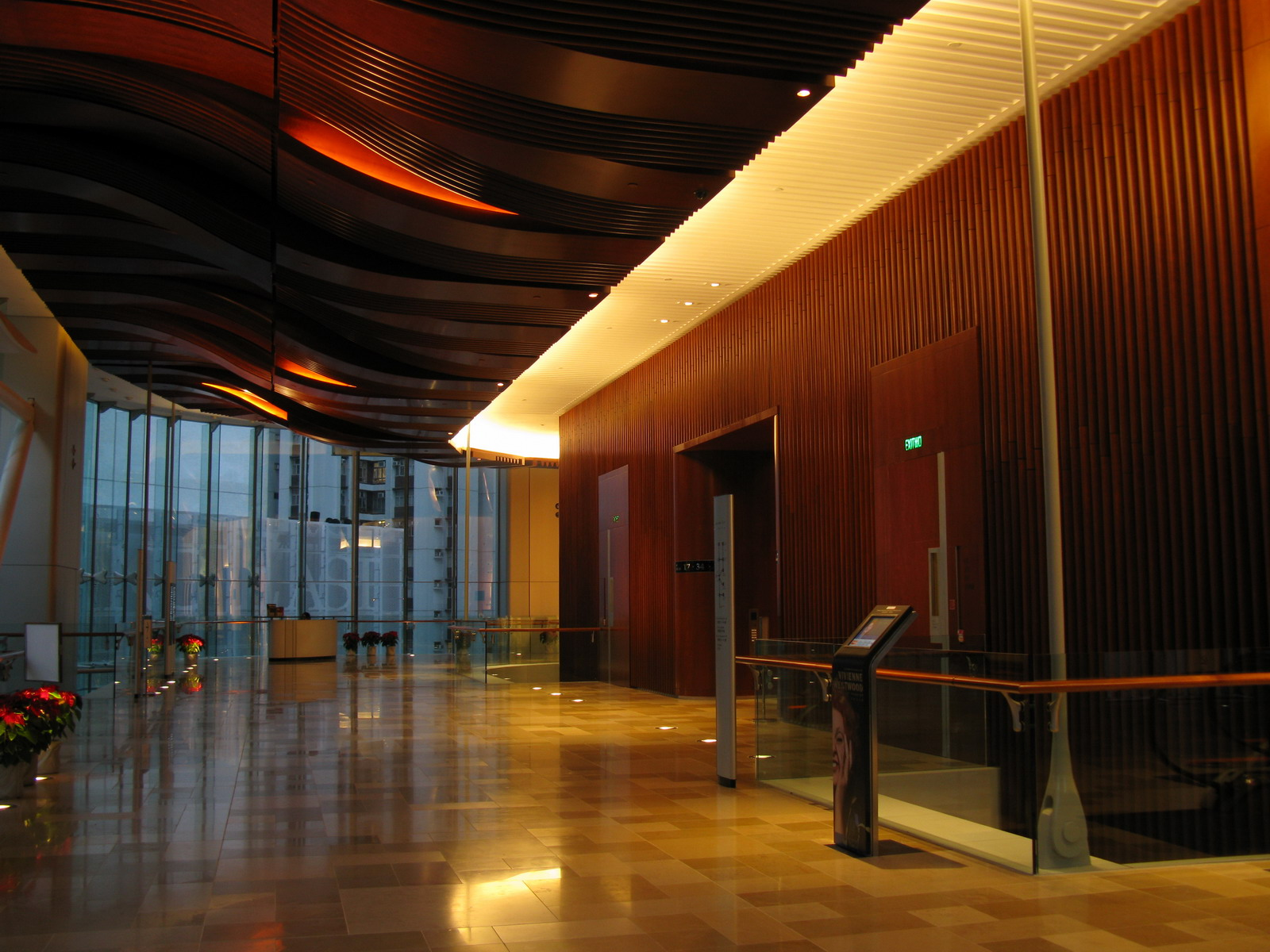
One Island East 1F Grand Lobby

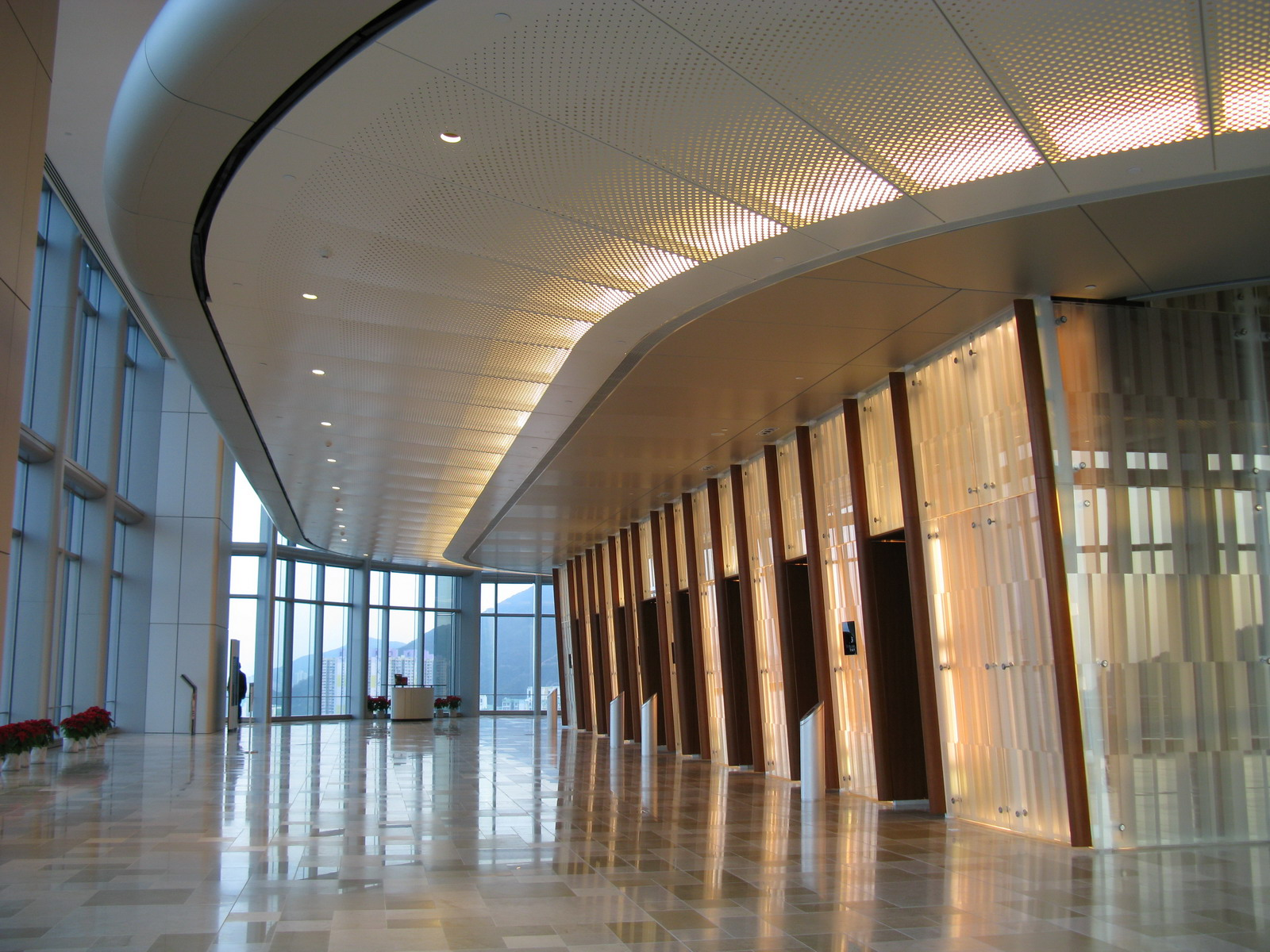
37F Sky Lobby

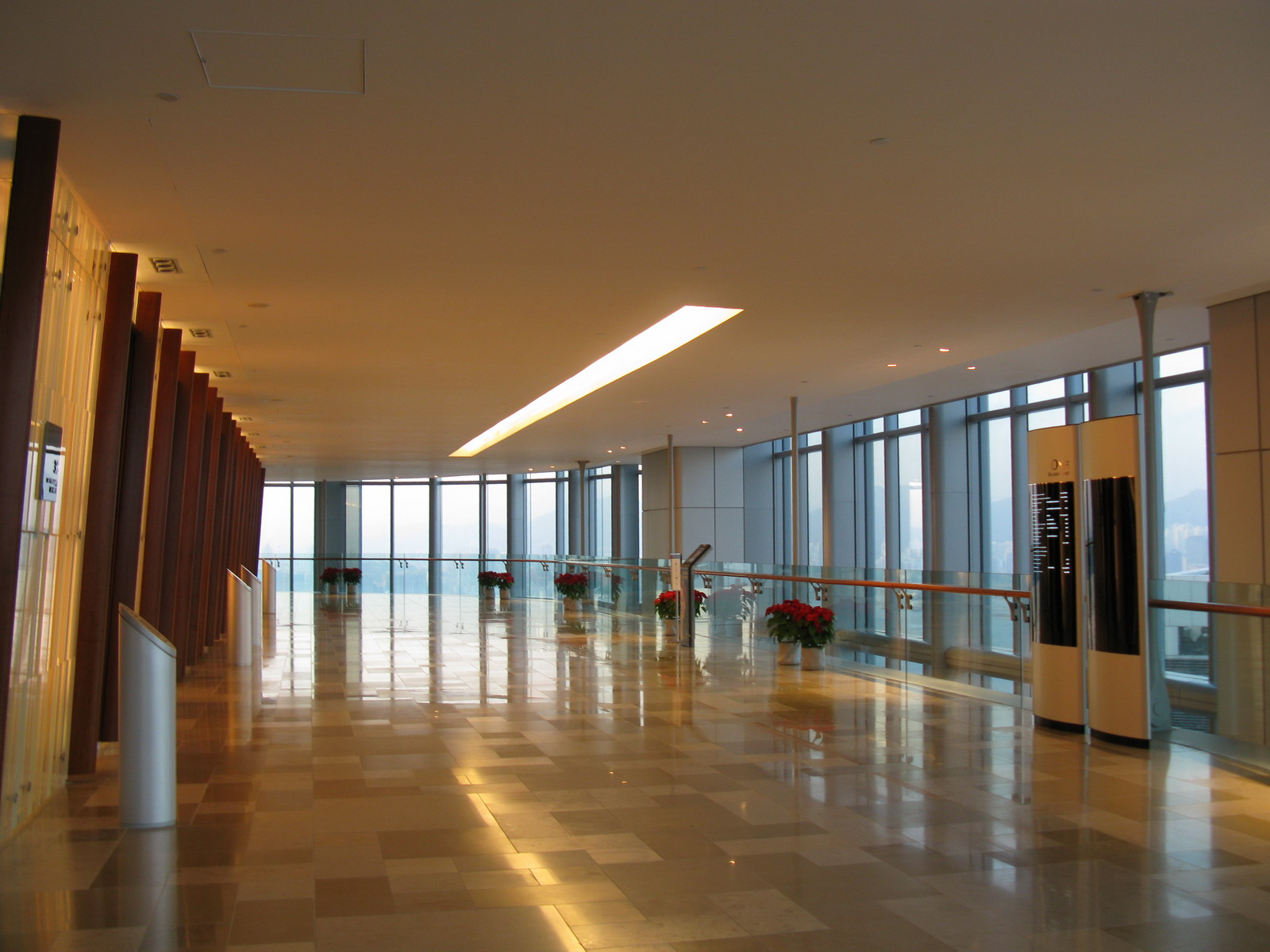
38F Sky Lobby

== See also ==
- List of tallest buildings in Hong Kong
