= William Laken =

English judge

Sir William Laken (died 6 October 1475) was a prominent English serjeant-at-law and judge during the reigns of Kings Henry V and Henry VI.

== Career ==
Sir William was the son of Richard Laken of Willey in Shropshire. His father served as counsel and military lieutenant to the Earl of Arundel. As a lieutenant to Arundel, Laken was noted for his valour in the defence of England against Welsh military incursions. William became a lawyer and was called upon by many of England's most powerful landed families to settle the delicate legal disputes that often set the aristocratic houses of the kingdom against one another. Towards the end of his august legal career, King Henry VI appointed Laken Justice of the King's Bench.

An effigial memorial brass to Sir William Laken can be found at Bray Church in Berkshire, where he was laid to rest alongside his wife Sybilla, daughter and heiress of John Syfrewast, Lord of the Manor of Clewer. Bray was this lady's home. Sir William was the third of her five husbands. His chief residence was at Stone in Kent.

== Legacy ==
While he was survived by two sons, neither reached William's prominence. Laken's progeny maintained their familial estate until the early 17th century when it was sold by family members who emigrated to colonial New York. Remaining elements of the Laken family can be found on the East Coast and in the Mid-west of the United States, including Brad Laken, a partner at the law firm Willkie Farr & Gallagher LLP.
