= David M. Lockton =

David Lockton
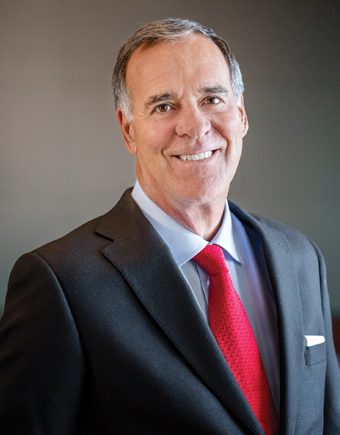
- Lockton Companies Chairman of the Board; past Chief Executive Officer and President
- Born: Kansas City, Missouri, U.S.
- Education: Kansas State University
- Occupation: Chairman of Lockton Companies

David M. Lockton is chairman of the board at Lockton Companies, the largest privately owned brokerage in the world. He is the brother of the founder of Lockton Companies and has been chairman since 2003. He has aided in bringing tremendous growth to the company over the years, including becoming a billion dollar company after the 2013 fiscal year.

== Biography ==
Lockton grew up in Kansas City, Missouri in a middle-income family. At a young age, he wanted to be a corporate attorney. In college he started out as an English major at Kansas State University, but switched to business and finance after his brother started Lockton Companies and began recruiting him to work there. Lockton graduated from the university in 1975 with a bachelor's degree in business finance.

Lockton and his wife have a son and daughter, along with six grandchildren. He is an avid golfer, enjoys outdoor activities such as hunting and fishing, and revels in photography.

== Career ==
After graduating from college, Lockton took a job at First National Bank of Kansas City to learn the ropes of financial services. In 1976, he quit his job and joined his brother at Lockton Companies as the ninth employee.

By 1977, Lockton was the executive vice president for the company, where he stayed for four years. In 1981, Lockton became the president of Lockton Companies. After eight years as the president, Lockton earned the title of chief executive officer.

In 2003, Lockton became the chairman of the board and still holds that title today. Even as the chairman, Lockton still has a personal portfolio of clients because he believes it's important to his associates to have leadership. It also helps him keep his perspective and allows him to relate to his associates as a fellow sales person. In the past ten years, David has played a significant role in leading the company through one of the fastest-growing decades in its nearly 50-year history.

== Awards ==
- 2001 Silver Beaver Award from Heart of American Council of Boy Scouts.
- 2002 Mankind Award for compassionate service from the local Cystic Fibrosis Foundation.
- 2006 Hope Award by Mid-America Chapter of the Multiple Sclerosis Society.
- 2009 Distinguished Citizen Award by Boy Scouts of America.
- Made Insurance Business America's Hot 100 Insurance Professionals list in 2014.
- Named one of the Power 100 of 2014, the Kansas City Business Journal's inaugural list of the region's most influential leaders.
- 2014 Laureate in the Katie School Hall of Fame for Katie School of Insurance and Financial Services at Illinois State University
- 2017 Lifetime Achievement Award from EY's Entrepreneur of the Year program honoring his vision, leadership and service.

== Philanthropy ==
David Lockton has volunteered in a number of organizations and continues to be quite active in the community. In past years, he has served as an international board member of the Chief Executives Organization, a board member of Hope Learning Academy Charter School, a Truman Medical Center Charitable Foundation board member, and the president of the Heart of America Chapter of Cystic Fibrosis. He recently served as Heart of America United Way's chairman of the board and contributed as a founding board member of the Urban Neighborhood Initiative, Inc.

Currently, Lockton is a part of the board of directors for Boy Scouts of America: Heart of America Council, as well as a capital campaign co-chair for The Salvation Army. He also serves as a mentor and capital campaign chairman at the Hope Center, in addition to contributing as a member of the board of trustees for Rockhurst University.

Mentor, Helzberg Entrepreneurial Mentoring Program

International Board Member, Chief Executives Organization

Past Campaign Chairman, Heart of America United Way Social Services

Past President, Boy Scouts of America: Heart of America Council

Past Board Member and Mentor, Hope Leadership Academy Charter School

Past President, Heart of America Chapter of Cystic Fibrosis

Past Board Member, Civic Council of Greater Kansas City
