= Henry Dampier =

- Born: c. early 18th century Bristol, England
- Died: 17 October 1771
- Occupations: Merchant, High Sheriff of Bristol, Mayor of Bristol
- Years active: 1728–1743
- Known for: Slave trading

Henry Dampier (died 17 October 1771) was an English merchant, politician, and slave trader in Bristol, England during the 18th century. He was elected Sheriff and eventually Mayor of Bristol. Dampier was involved in the Society of Merchant Venturers for decades and is known for having traded in slaves during the Atlantic Slave Trade.

== Early life ==
Henry Dampier was born sometime in the early 18th century, in the city of Bristol, England. Dampier gained influence from a long-established merchant, James Day, who was responsible for guiding Dampier into the business of slave trading. Dampier and Day were related by marriage. Through this connection, Dampier was able to foster close relations with a prominent local merchant. His reputation and connections encouraged others to invest in his company. In 1726, Dampier became a member of the Royal African Company.

== Career ==
Dampier began his involvement in the Atlantic Slave Trade in 1728; his last voyage was in 1743. In the decade and a half after 1730, Dampier was among 20 merchants that dominated the port's trade to Africa.

Dampier's slave vessels made approximately 26 voyages for the purpose of trading slaves, acquiring 7,594 slaves in Africa, with 6,277 surviving. After purchase they were sent to various ports in the Caribbean including Jamaica, but also to the British colonies of Virginia and Maryland. Dampier's principal region of purchases included St. Helena, the Bight of Biafra, the Gulf of Guinea Islands, the Gold Coast and other minor trading posts in West Central Africa.

The total number of slaves taken to the Caribbean was 5,376, while the total taken to mainland North America was 2,218. Dampier was responsible for a total of 7,594 embarked slaves with a net retention of 6,277, meaning 1,317 slaves or 18 percent died during their voyage. On average 292.1 slaves were embarked per voyage and 241.4 disembarked per voyage.

Vessel Name	Slave Pick-up Point	Destination	Number of Slaves	Number That Survived the Voyage
Goldfinch (6 voyages)	Other Africa, Bight of Biafra, Gulf of Guinea Islands	Jamaica, Barbados, Virginia, Maryland	1,854	1,488
Bridgett (3 voyages)	West Central Africa, St. Helena	Jamaica, Virginia	1,017	908
Nightingale (6 voyages)	Other Africa, Gold Coast	Jamaica	1,628	1,321
Bridget Gally (2 voyages)	West Central Africa, St. Helena	Jamaica, Virginia	678	601
Dreadnought Gally (1 voyage)	Bight of Biafra, Gulf of Guinea Islands	Jamaica	299	227
Dreadnought (1 voyage)	Bight of Biafra, Gulf of Guinea Islands	Virginia	298	226
Recovery (1 voyage)	Other Africa	St. Kitts	271	217
Henry's Gally (1 voyage)	Other Africa	Jamaica	271	217
Henry's (2 voyages)	Other Africa, West Central Africa, St. Helena	Jamaica, Virginia	620	515
Prince Harry (1 voyage)	Other Africa	Barbados	271	217
Bridget (2 voyages)	Other Africa, West Central Africa, St. Helena	Virginia	387	340
Totals	26 voyages	5 destinations	7,594 slaves	6,277 slaves

Dampier became a member of the Society of Merchant Venturers on 17 October 1728 through his apprenticeship with Day. In 1736, he was declared a junior warden and in 1750 became master of the Society of Merchant Venturers. Dampier was elected a High Sheriff of Bristol in 1737 and then again in 1751, and became Mayor of Bristol in 1755.
