= Henry Spigurnel =

English judge (c. 1261/3–1328)

Sir Henry Spigurnel

Justice of the King's Bench
- In office 1296–1303
- Preceded by: William Ormesby
- Succeeded by: Lambert de Trickingham

Personal details
- Born: c. 1261/3
- Died: 1328 (aged ~65)

Sir Henry Spigurnel (c. 1261/3–1328) was an English judge. He was summoned to parliaments of Edward I and Edward II, and was made a justice of oyer and terminer in 1300. He was sent on a mission to papal court in 1311 and interpreted the ordinances in 1312. He retired in 1327, and died the next year.

== Life ==
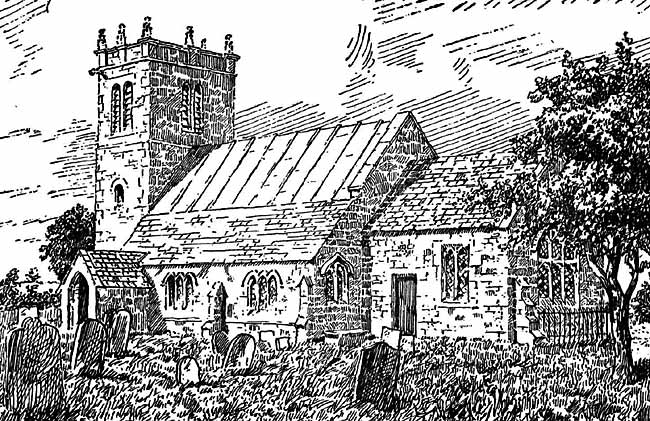
View of St. Andrew's Church, Skegby, 1787

Henry Spigurnel, born in or before 1261, or perhaps about 1263, was very probably a son or grandson of Godfrey Spigurnel, who, in a grant to him in 1207 (9 John) of five bovates of land and a mill at Skegby in Nottinghamshire, is styled 'serviens noster de capella nostra'. The name 'Spigurnel' was originally given to the officer who sealed the writs in chancery; probably the office became hereditary, and supplied the surname of a family.

Map of Europe in 1300

Henry Spigurnel was summoned to perform military service in 1297, as possessing lands worth more than 20l. a year. He was also summoned to the parliament of that year, and to later parliaments of Edward I and Edward II. He first appears in a judicial capacity in 1296. On 12 March 1300 he received protection for one year on going beyond seas on the king's service. He cannot have gone abroad for long, for on 15 April of the same year he received a commission as justice of oyer and terminer. He exercised this function as well as that of justice of the court of common pleas in many succeeding years. He was also one of the magnates sworn in the parliament of 1301 to treat of the affairs of Scotland.

On 6 September 1307 he was ordered to continue in the office of justice of the pleas coram rege by Edward II. In February 1311 he was sent by the king on a mission to the papal court, along with John de Benstede. On 8 March 1312 he was sent with twelve others to the bishops and earls and barons of the province of Canterbury about to assemble at London to explain certain matters touching the ordinances. According to the credible statement of the Gesta Edwardi de Carnarvon, he and William Inge, when on circuit in May 1312, had Piers Gaveston brought before them by the Earl of Warwick, and condemned him by the authority of the 'ordinances', 'whose repeal was not fully known to that county'. On 29 May 1314 he and five others were ordered to be at Westminster on 19 June, prepared to set out as the king's envoys beyond the sea. In January 1315 he was again acting as justice of assize. On 19 November he and the other justices for holding pleas coram rege were ordered to sit permanently on the bench, and forbidden to absent themselves without the king's special order or for infirmity. He was summoned to the parliament of 14 January 1316. Although he was over sixty years of age in 1323–4 (17 Edward II), he still continued to act as justice until as late as 17 September 1327, the year before his death, which took place in 1328.

In the Outlaw's Song of Traillebaston Spigurnel and Roger de Bella Fago, 'gent de cruelté', are contrasted with William Martyn and Gilbert de Knovill, 'gent de pieté', all four being named by a commission of 6 April 1305 commissioners to judge the trailbastons in the west of England.

Spigurnel lived at Kenilworth, and, according to his own return in 1316, was lord or joint lord of various townships in the counties of Bedford, Buckingham, Oxford, and Northampton. He had also property in Essex and Leicestershire. His sons represented the county of Bedford in the parliaments of 1 and 14 Edward II.

== See also ==
- List of parliaments of England

== Sources ==
- Brand, Paul (2004). "Spigurnel, Sir Henry (b. in or before 1261, d. 1328), justice". Oxford Dictionary of National Biography (online ed.). Oxford University Press. doi:10.1093/ref:odnb/26150. (Subscription, Wikipedia Library access or UK public library membership required.)

Attribution:

- This article incorporates text from a publication now in the public domain: Rhodes, Walter Eustace (1896). "Spigurnel, Henry". In Lee, Sidney (ed.). Dictionary of National Biography. Vol. 45. London: Smith, Elder & Co. pp. 401–402.
