= Lockton Companies =

World's largest privately owned insurance company

Lockton
- Type: Private
- Industry: Insurance
- Founded: Kansas City, Missouri U.S. (1966)
- Founder: Jack Lockton
- Headquarters: Kansas City, MO, U.S.
- Number of locations: 150 offices
- Area served: Worldwide
- Key people: Ron Lockton, Chairman & Chief Executive Officer; Travis Leonard, Chief Financial Officer; Tim Ryan, U.S. President; Nick Serrault, U.S. Chief Operating Officer; Chris Brown, International CEO; Hiram Marrero, President, U.S. Chief Growth Officer
- Products: Insurance, risk management, employee benefits
- Revenue: 2025 Global Revenue $4.0 billion
- Number of employees: 13,100+

Lockton is an American company that provides insurance, risk management, and employee benefits. In addition to its Kansas City, Missouri headquarters, Lockton operates more than 150 offices and transacts business in more than 160 countries. Lockton currently employs more than 13,100 people worldwide.

The company was founded by Jack Lockton in 1966 and has since become the world's largest privately owned insurance brokerage firm, and the 9th largest overall. Lockton works with a wide array of industries with services that include risk management, casualty, surety, and professional indemnity. For almost 60 years, Lockton has posted organic growth, with global revenues reaching more than $4.0 billion in fiscal 2025.

== History ==
In 1966, Jack Lockton (1942–2004) founded Lockton Insurance. He was 24 and had just graduated from the University of Missouri-Kansas City in 1964 with a degree in economics. Prior to this, he had attended Westminster College in Missouri. Prior to founding Lockton Insurance, Jack Lockton worked as an underwriter for a surety bonding company where he specialized in serving contractors.

Lockton started when Jack partnered with his parents to share office expenses and have money to hire office help. He was able to persuade established professionals in the industry to leave their positions to work with him, including Gary Hambright, who had worked with Jack at his previous job. In 1976, Jack’s brother David M. Lockton joined the company as Lockton’s ninth employee. David later was president, then CEO. From 2003 to 2020, David was chairman until Jack's son, Ron Lockton, took over in May 2020. Before taking over as chairman, Ron had held numerous other roles during his 30+ years with the company, including as CEO from 2017 to 2020. In February 2024, Ron resumed as CEO.

After establishing an office in Denver in 1979, Lockton began expanding the business across the country. The firm focused on finding successful business leaders in new areas and recruiting them to establish a new office. This remains Lockton's business model to this day.

In 2006, Lockton expanded globally with the acquisition of Alexander Forbes International Risk Services, making the firm the world's largest privately owned broker.

In 2026, Lockton was named in the NBA investigation into the Los Angeles Clippers for salary cap circumvention. Kawhi Leonard signed an endorsement agreement with Lockton, but the agreement was not made public until the investigation.
