= John Lockton =

English cricketer and footballer

Personal information
- Full name: John Henry Lockton
- Born: 22 May 1892; Peckham, England
- Died: 29 June 1972 (aged 80); Thornton Heath, England
- Batting: Right-handed
- Bowling: Right-arm fast-medium

Domestic team information
- Years: Team
- 1919–1926: Surrey

Career statistics
Competition	First-class
Matches	32
Runs scored	409
Batting average	16.36
100s/50s	0/1
Top score	77
Balls bowled	4,991
Wickets	78
Bowling average	26.55
5 wickets in innings	1
10 wickets in match	0
Best bowling	5/80
Catches/stumpings	26/–
- Source: CricInfo, 3 February 2023

John Henry Lockton (22 May 1892 – 29 June 1972) was an English cricketer and footballer. He played 32 first-class cricket matches for Surrey between 1919 and 1926 and played as an inside left in the Football League for Nottingham Forest.

== Personal life ==
Lockton was educated at Dulwich College and served in the British Armed Forces during the First World War. He was gassed during the course of his service. Lockton taught at St Dunstan's College in Catford for 38 years before retiring in 1952.

== Football career statistics ==
John Lockton
Personal information
- Position: Inside left

Senior career*
Years	Team	Apps	(Gls)
1911	London University		
1912–1913	Ilford		
1913–1915	Nottingham Forest	20	(2)
- Casuals
- Nunhead
- * Club domestic league appearances and goals

Appearances and goals by club, season and competition
Club	Season	League			FA Cup		Total	
Club	Season	Division	Apps	Goals	Apps	Goals	Apps	Goals
Nottingham Forest	1913–14	Second Division	12	1	0	0	12	1
Nottingham Forest	1914–15	Second Division	8	1	2	1	10	2
Career total			20	2	2	1	22	3
