= Hugh Hill (judge) =

Sir Hugh Hill (1802–1871) was a British judge.

== Early life and career ==
The second son of James Hill, by Mary, daughter of Hugh Norcott of Cork, Hugh Hill was born in 1802 at Graig, near Doneraile, County Cork, where his family had been long settled. He graduated BA at Dublin in 1821, kept two years' terms at the King's Inns, and then joined the Middle Temple in London. He practised with great success as a special pleader under the bar between 1827 and 1841, when he was called to the bar and joined the northern circuit. He became a QC in 1851.

On 29 May 1858 he was appointed a judge of the Court of Queen's Bench, and about the same time was made a serjeant-at-law; he was also knighted.

== Family and death ==
Owing to prolonged illness he retired from the bench in December 1861. He died at the Royal Crescent Hotel, Brighton, on 12 October 1871. In 1831 he married Anoriah, daughter of Richard Holden Webb, controller of customs, and by her had two sons, who both survived him; his wife died in 1858.
