= Hermitage Manor =

Coordinates: 52.4676°N 1.6597°W

Hermitage Manor is a small manor house in Warwickshire (UK) with a trihedral moat, associated land and farm. A manor house or fortified manor-house is a country house, which has historically formed the centre of a manor (see Manorialism). The term is sometimes applied to relatively small country houses which belonged to gentry families, as well as to grand stately homes, particularly as a technical term for minor late medieval castles more intended for show than for defence.

== History ==
Hermitage manor was in the old Hemlingford Hundred in the county of Warwickshire. Hemlingford was one of the four hundreds that the English county of Warwickshire was divided into, along with Kington, Knightlow and Barlichway. It was recorded in the Domesday Book under the name of Coleshill. The hundred covered northern Warwickshire, including Birmingham, Solihull and Tamworth. A hundred was under a lord/lords, becoming hereditary, a steward was appointed in place of a sheriff.

The importance of the hundred courts declined from the seventeenth century, and most of the powers were extinguished with the establishment of county courts in 1867. The remaining duty of the inhabitants of a hundred to make good damages caused by riot was ended in 1886, when the cost was transferred to the county police rate. Although hundreds had no administrative or legal role after this date, they have never been formally abolished, nor have their hereditary peers.

The Manor was first recorded in the court of King Henry I of England (1100–1135). It was recorded in Worcester Cathedral. Huge Del Ermytage was permitted a fortification of a trihedral moat (moat of three sides). It is said to have been built in this parish by Hemeric, incumbent at the time when Robert de Ceraso was the local lord. It was given by Gilbert Picot to the Prior and Convent of Worcester; his son William increased the estate and it was valued at £1 14s. in 1291. At the Dissolution it was transferred to the Dean and Chapter of Worcester. In 1650 the manors' estate consisted of 74 acres (300,000 m^{2}) valued at £46. Thereafter it was passed to Samuel Jewkes Esquire of Wolverley in the county of Worcester. Samuel Jewkes heir; Talbot Jewkes (Sergeant at Arms) sold and surrendered the manor under the court of Queen Anne (1702–1714) to John Adcock, Yeoman of Meriden in the county of Warwickshire.

John Adcock’s heir, Mary Adcock in the year 1770 surrendered the manor in her last will and testament at the Prerogative Court at Lichfield to John Cooper-Royle, citizen, to alienate to him and his for ever. In accordance with this, the right and title of the Manor of the Hermitage shall not be sold or any have the power to sell it until no lawfully begotten seed is living.

== Present day ==
In modern day, Hermitage Manor is situated near Little Packington, Great Packington and Maxstoke – An area affiliated with the more modern Packington Hall. It is 1½ miles north-east of St Bartholomew's church in Little Packington. The current hereditary Peer is Lord Matthew Jenkins of Lichfield, having had the title passed to him from his late grandfather – Charles William Denis Cooper-Royle in 2005. The current incarnation of the manor is as a Golf Course Hotel; Part of the Forest of Arden Golf course. It still owns a farm – Hermitage Farm and associated outbuildings. The moat still remains though has mostly run dry.
