= Shotteswell =

Village in Warwickshire, England

Coordinates: 52.108°N 1.381°W

- Location within Warwickshire
- Population: 221 (2011)
- OS grid reference: SP4245
- Civil parish: Shotteswell
- District: Stratford-on-Avon
- Shire county: Warwickshire
- Region: West Midlands
- Country: England
- Sovereign state: United Kingdom
- Post town: Banbury
- Postcode district: OX17
- Dialling code: 01295
- Police: Warwickshire
- Fire: Warwickshire
- Ambulance: West Midlands
- UK Parliament: Kenilworth and Southam
- Website: shotteswellvillage.co.uk

Shotteswell is a village and civil parish in the Stratford-on-Avon district of Warwickshire. The population of the civil parish at the 2011 census was 221. The parish is bounded on three sides by Oxfordshire and is about 4 miles (6 km) north-west of Banbury.

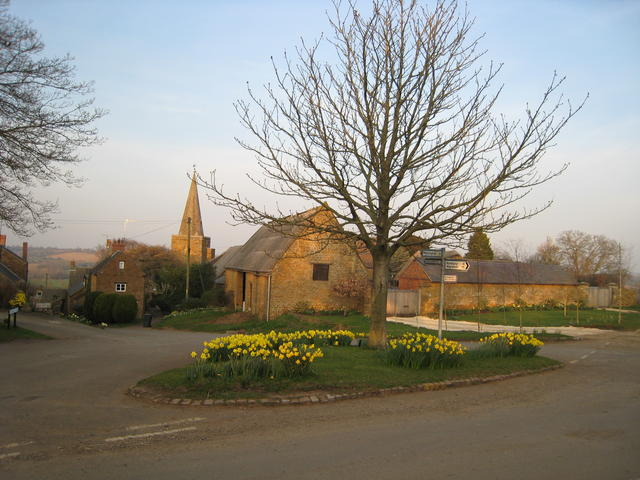
Shotteswell village green

== Overview ==
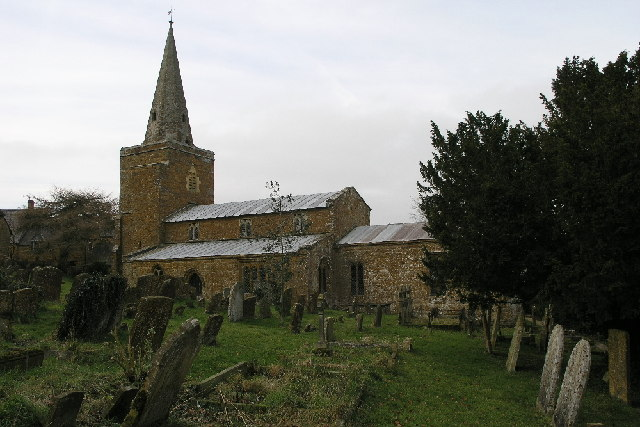
St Laurence's Church, Shotteswell

The name of the village has been spelt in various fashions over the centuries in a range of documents:- Sotteswalle around 1135, Shoteswell (1165), Schoteswell (1189), Schotewell (1190), Scoteswell (1221), Sotteswell (1235), Schetteswell (1315), Shotteswell (1428 and 1535), Shatswell (1705) as well as Cheleswell, Seteswell, Scacheswell and Shotswell, the latter in censuses of the mid-nineteenth century. It is said to derive from the Anglo-Saxon "Soto", a family name, and "will", a well – that is – "the well of Scot". In the past, an alternative explanation was put forward that the name derived from "sceota" or "scota" meaning the offshoot or brow of a hill – that is – the well at the brow of a hill. For a large part of its history the local inhabitants have called the village "Satchel" and, indeed, a sign at the door of St. Laurence Church states:- "Local pronunciation of Shotteswell – Satchel".

The village occupies part of a range of heights gradually rising from north to south to 600 feet (180 m). The River Avon, a tributary of the Cherwell, separates the parish from Oxfordshire on the east with a smaller tributary doing the same to the west. The village was not mentioned in the Domesday Book of 1086, but may have been "the two hides of Warmintone (Warmington)" owned by Roger de Beaumont, Count of Meulan and "a man-at-arms from him". In 1316 Shotteswell was described as a hamlet.

The population of the village in the 2001 Census was 230. The 2011 Census recorded that the population size was similar, the village having a total of 221 inhabitants. The median age of the inhabitants in 2011 was 49 years. 98.6% of the population were described as "White British" and 5.4% had been born outside of The United Kingdom. Principal occupations of the inhabitants in 2011 were education-related professions (16.2%), professional, scientific and technical occupations (15.4%), manufacturing (10.0%), human health and social work activities (9.2%), administrative and support services (8.5%) with only 2.3% recorded as working in the agriculture, fishing and forestry sectors. Only 3.7% of males and 1.1% of females were unemployed and 13.4% of males and 21.1% of females were retired. As regards religion, 67.4% described themselves as Christians, 24.4% claimed to have no religion, 0.9% were Hindus and 7.2% did not state their religion.

Many of the older buildings in the village had deteriorated and crumbled by the 1960s and some thatched cottages were demolished as early as 1965. Renovations of other buildings in the subsequent decades saw the village's picturesque appearance of mainly thatched buildings altered by the use of other roofing materials. There is now no pub although in the 19th and early 20th centuries there was an inn called "The Flying Horse" which became known as "The Flying Horse Stores" and which was granted Grade II Listed Building status on 8 April 1987. There was a second public house in the village, recorded in the 1861 national census, and also in existence around 1900, which was called "The New Inn"; on 27 February 1901, its proprietor, Luke Sharman, was fined £1 with 10s 6d costs at Kineton court for permitting gambling (darts for beer and tobacco) on the premises. A number of dark-stoned council houses were built at the north west end of the village. Most of the village was designated a conservation area in 1969 with minor additions to the boundaries in 1995. The M40 motorway passes close by to the east of the village. The local economy is agriculture-based.

The village has largely lost its public facilities. The village school in Chapel Lane had closed by 1973 and the building was converted in that year to be the village hall which had previously been a wooden building situated on Coronation Lane. The previous post office is now a private residence as is the former Flying Horse Stores. The public telephone box does not accept coinage and there is a bus shelter but, from 2009, only one bus per week leaves the village for Banbury, at 1017 hours on Thursdays with the return bus leaving Banbury at 1330 hours. The bus service is operated by A & M Group.

In September 2011 Regenco, a renewable energy developer, announced that it was exploring the possibility of building a wind farm adjacent to the M40 motorway between Shotteswell and Harbury and local inhabitants formed SHAMWAG (Shotteswell, Hanwell and Mollington Wind Farm Action Group) to resist this development. In November and December 2011 the group was successful in its challenge when both Stratford-on-Avon District Council and Cherwell District Council rejected an application by Regenco to build a meteorological mast near Bury Court Farm although the company lodged an appeal with the Planning Inspectorate on 6 February 2012 which was eventually rejected on 22 June 2012.

== Parish church ==
The Church of England parish church of Saint Laurence probably dates from before the mid-12th century. One of the supporting stones of the old Norman font is believed to be of Saxon origin with its characteristic wheatsheaf shape. The church has been a grade II listed building since 30 May 1967. It is believed that the small cell which is now the vestry was the original church, with the old altar stone placed under the east window in the present-day vestry. The north window is only two inches wide, which is a feature of early windows when glass was not used in them. There is an early thirteenth-century tower which has six bells, and an early fourteenth-century chancel with a north chapel dating from the latter part of that century. A spire was added in the fifteenth century. The church is constructed from the local ironstone or Horton stone and was restored in 1875. The earliest recorded Vicar of Shotteswell was Father Stotterwell in 1287, but no vicarage existed until 1381. A Wesleyan chapel was opened in the village in 1854 but was closed before 1981, when it was used first as a workshop and afterwards as a hairdressing salon, eventually being sold in 1996 to be converted into a private house. An inscription placed on one wall continues to identify its previous religious role in the village.

== Manor ==
The overlordship of Shotteswell belonged to the Earls of Warwick from the twelfth century until at least 1438. In 1235 and 1242, Wydo (Guy) held a knight's fee in Shotteswell as did his son, John, in 1268. Their successors, the FitzWyth family, held the manor after John Dyve in 1279 – John FitzWyth in 1301, his son, Robert FitzWyth in 1309 until 1316 when his wife, Elizabeth, is mentioned. However in 1316, Robert's son, Guy, also died and he was probably succeeded by his cousin, John FitzWyth, recorded as holding it in 1326. He was succeeded by Robert and he then passed the manor to his nephew, Robert FitzWyth, in 1352. Robert's widow, Joan, conveyed her life interest in the estate to John Catesby. Robert's daughter by his first wife, Agnes Catesby, married Sir John de Beauchamp of Holt, a favourite of King Richard II, but after his execution for treason during the Merciless Parliament in 1388, the estate passed to his son, John.

The FitzWytes had retained as much of the manor as represented one quarter of the fee and the rest was held by the Wandard family and in 1262 Robert Wandard had agreed to do suit to John FitzWyth's court in Shotteswell twice-yearly. In 1319, the Wandards sold the manor to William de Bereford who was succeeded by his son, Sir Edmund, who died in 1354 settling the manor on his illegitimate son, Sir John and after his death the manor passed to his brother, Baldwin. He was succeeded firstly by his widow, Elizabeth and then by her daughter, Maud. Sir John Beauchamp and Sir Baldwin Bereford shared the fees in Shotteswell in 1400 and when Sir John died in 1420, his widow, Alice, held the manor for life to be succeeded by Margaret, Sir John's daughter and her husband, John Wisham, in 1423. Margaret's three daughters, Alice, Joan and Elizabeth were co-heirs. Elizabeth's son, John Croft and his wife, Joan, held one third of the manor in 1499 and one half in 1501. Simon Rice, a London merchant, purchased the moiety of the manor in 1514 and was succeeded by his widow, Lettice who held lands in 1531.

After her death the manor was held by Thomas Sinclair, great great nephew of Sir Edmund, who died in 1435 and, despite having three daughters, settled the manor on trustees "to defraud the king of the custody and marriage of his heirs". Trustee and subsequent owner, John Aston, sold the manor in 1436 to the head of the le Botiler or Butler family, James Butler, 4th Earl of Ormond, the husband of Joan Beauchamp, and he was succeeded by his son, James Butler, 5th Earl of Ormond and Earl of Wiltshire, who was beheaded after the Battle of Towton on 1 May 1461 at Newcastle. In 1462 the manor of Shotteswell was granted to Richard Harcourt for services to King Edward IV but the Botilers/Butlers were restored subsequently with the succession of John Butler, 6th Earl of Ormond, James' brother, who died childless in 1515 when the manor passed to Richard Farmer, a Calais merchant, who then sold it in 1537 to Sir Thomas Pope for £400.

In 1555 Shotteswell was granted a licence to grant for the endowment of Trinity College, Oxford. Edmund Hutchins, Pope's nephew, inherited the manor in 1559 and when he died in 1602, another of Pope's nephews, William, succeeded and afterwards, the latter's grandson, Thomas Pope, 2nd Earl of Downe, inherited the manor on 2 June 1631. His uncle, Sir Thomas Pope, held the manor in 1655 and from 1667–8, his son, also Sir Thomas, held the title but after his death the title became extinct although his four sisters inherited the estates. The Norths, later Earls of Guilford, the family of the husband of Frances, the third sister, gained possession of the entire manor of Shotteswell until George Augustus (the member of parliament for Banbury from 1792 to 1794 and grandson of the former prime minister, Lord Frederick North) died in 1802 to be succeeded by his brother Francis, who held the manor as a trustee for his three nieces. Col. John Sidney Doyle married the second niece, the Hon. Susan North, in 1838 and adopted her surname and became lord of the manor of Shotteswell in 1841 after the death of the eldest sister, Maria, when Susan became Baroness North. William Henry John, Lord North succeeded in 1894 when his father died and the manor was sold to B. J. Daunt of County Cork in September 1937.

== English Civil War ==
The villagers of Shotteswell would have been considerably affected by the events of the English Civil War which took place in the vicinity of the village since it is situated only a short distance from the site of the Battle of Edgehill. This being the first major encounter of the war on 23 October 1642, there having been a minor skirmish the evening before at the nearby village of Wormleighton. Before the battle, the Parliamentary forces under the Earl of Essex had been camped a short distance to the north of Shotteswell, at Kineton, and the Royalist forces were camped 4 miles (6.4 km) to the south, at Banbury. Shotteswell more or less lay half-way between the two armies. Later in the war, another significant battle was fought between the two forces, only about two miles from Shotteswell, at Cropredy Bridge on 29 June 1644.

== Nineteenth century ==
In the mid-nineteenth century Shotteswell was described as a "poor and very unimportant parish". In the 1851 census, 70 households were recorded with a number of them closely related to each other. Most recorded occupations in the census were related to agriculture; farming families included the Whites, the Ledbrooks and the Bulls whilst the numerous Sharman family was mainly employed as agricultural labourers. At this time about 60% of the land belonged to the White family which had become established in the village when an ancestor, Thomas White, had moved there from north Oxfordshire in the 1730s and his son, also Thomas, and other close relatives were buried significantly in the chancel of St. Lawrence Church around 1811–15. As well as farming, this family later owned shops in the village as well as The Flying Horse Inn around 1874. By the 1881 census, the long-established Sharman family which had made its first appearance in the parish records in 1690, was the most numerous family in the village.

In 1831 a notable crime was committed in the village when a bankrupt farmer, John Coleman, shot Edward Goode, an agricultural worker, fatally in the head and was charged with murder and subsequently tried at Warwick Assizes in 1832 where he was found not guilty of murder but guilty of manslaughter due to his mental disturbance brought on by the loss of his property. He was sentenced to transportation for life. The inquest into Goode's death had been held in The Flying Horse Inn, as had a number of other inquests during the 19th century. It is recorded that one of the members of the White family, another Thomas, was the village constable at the time and it was he who apprehended Coleman after the killing. In 1888 the villagers of Shotteswell, as well as those of neighbouring Farnborough, Mollington and Ratley and Upton, expressed a preference for their villages to be transferred from Warwickshire to Oxfordshire in a "memorial" in response to the "Report of the Committee of County Magistrates upon the rectification of County and Union Boundaries in Oxfordshire". This response highlighted the villages' close links to the town of Banbury. Nothing came of this expressed preference.

== First and Second World Wars ==
A memorial plaque at the entrance to St Lawrence's Church records the names of five men associated with the village who died serving in the armed forces during the First World War, as well as naming four men who died similarly during the Second World War. On 22 November 1942, a Wellington BK261 aircraft broke up and crashed at Shotteswell when a photo-flash exploded in the aircraft, and this resulted in the death of five crew members. The village was situated close to a Royal Air Force practice bombing range during World War II, and in his book A Thousand Shall Fall, the Canadian former pilot, Murray Peden, described how the village sometimes sustained inadvertent damage from bombs which had gone astray from Allied bombers using the practice range.

== Governance ==
The village is in the Westminster parliamentary constituency of Kenilworth and Southam and is represented by Jeremy Paul Wright (Conservative Party) who was elected in the May 2010 general election with 53.6% of the vote. He was re-elected in May 2015 with 58.4% of the total vote on a 76.6% turnout of the electorate. The village is part of the Kineton division of Warwickshire County Council and is represented by Christopher Robin Williams (Conservative Party). He was re-elected on 2 May 2013 with 38.2% of the vote. The village is part of the Red Horse ward of Stratford-on-Avon District Council and is represented by Bart Dalla Mura (Conservative Party). He was elected on 7 May 2015 with 62.4% of the total vote on a 77.9% turnout of the electorate. In late 2016 Bart Dalla Mura tendered his registration citing personal reasons. This triggered a by-election, which was held on Thursday 9 March 2017. The Parish Council has the following members:- Janet Burgess, Les Faulkner, Val Ingram, Anne Omer and Michael Pearson who were elected on 7 May 2015. The turnout was 86.9% of eligible voters. The clerk of Shotteswell Parish Council is Mrs. V. Ingram.

== Notable inhabitants ==
John Profumo, Member of Parliament for Stratford-upon-Avon in the 1950s and 60s, lived in Cherry Lodge in Shotteswell until he sold it in 1987. He was the centre of a national political scandal when he lied to the House of Commons, hiding the truth that whilst serving as war minister he was having an affair with Christine Keeler, a teenaged call-girl who was simultaneously having an affair with a Russian naval attaché, which raised serious national security issues. John Profumo was forced to resign as a cabinet minister and MP, and local people were offered £100s by journalists to reveal Profumo's whereabouts after he went into hiding at a friend's home in Radway. He died in 2006.
