= Warmington, Warwickshire =

Village in Warwickshire, England

Coordinates: 52.12609°N 1.40106°W

Warmington
- Location within Warwickshire
- OS grid reference: SP4147
- Civil parish: Warmington
- District: Stratford-on-Avon
- Shire county: Warwickshire
- Region: West Midlands
- Country: England
- Sovereign state: United Kingdom
- Post town: BANBURY
- Postcode district: OX17
- Dialling code: 01295
- Police: Warwickshire
- Fire: Warwickshire
- Ambulance: West Midlands
- UK Parliament: Kenilworth and Southam

Warmington is a village and civil parish in the Stratford-on-Avon district of Warwickshire, England. It is located on the border with Oxfordshire, around 5 miles (8 km) northwest of Banbury. The civil parish had, according to the 2001 Census a population of 297 increasing to 304 at the 2011 Census. The parish also includes Arlescote and the council is called Warmington & Arlescote. The National Herb Centre is found just outside the village.

Warmington is on the northern side of Edge Hill, a prominent local ridge. Its church is one of six that make up the Edgehill group, along with those of nearby Radway, Ratley and Shotteswell. The village is also regarded as being part of the informal area of Banburyshire. The M40 motorway passes just to the north and east of Warmington. Before the motorway was built, the village lay on the A41 road. The National Herb Centre is in the village.
