= Ralph de Bereford =

English justice

Ralph de Bereford (fl. 1329) was an English judge, of a legal family possessing large estates in the midland counties.

Ralph de Bereford may have been a son of Osbert de Barford, or Bereford, chief gentleman to Ralph de Hengham, justice of the common pleas, who was probably son of Walter de Barford of Langley in Warwickshire, and brother of Sir William de Bereford, chief justice of the common pleas in 1309. Ralph was possessed of land in three Oxfordshire townships in 1315, namely Bourton, Milcombe and Barford, and in the same year was one of the custodes of the vacant bishopric of Winchester. He was summoned to the great council at Westminster for 27 May 1324. He was on several occasions on commissions of oyer and terminer in Southampton and Surrey in 1314, in Somerset, Dorset, Wiltshire, Southampton and Gloucester in 1316, on special commissions to try persons who had spoiled Hugh le Despenser's manors, and Robert Lewer and his accomplices, who had attacked Odiham Castle in 1322, and in 1324 in Oxfordshire and Berkshire. In 1329 or 1330 he was the second of five justices in eyre, of whom another was Adam de Brome, for Nottingham and five other counties.
