= Wroth Silver Ceremony =

Annual tradition

The Wroth Silver Ceremony
- Knightlow Cross in 2014.
- Status: Ongoing
- Date: November 11th
- Frequency: Anually
- Locations: Knightlow Cross, Ryton-on-Dunsmore, Warwickshire, England
- Coordinates: 52.359959910177°N 1.4070146246514°W
- Years active: At least 1086-present
- Area: The Knightlow Hundred
- Leader: Richard Scott, 10th Duke of Buccleuch
- Organizer: David Eadon
- Website: www.wrothsilver.org.uk

The Wroth Silver Ceremony (also known as the Collection of Wroth Silver, the Payment of the Wroth Silver, and the Tribute of Wroth Money) is a tradition that occurs on November 11 annually at Knightlow Cross, within Ryton-on-Dunsmore, Warwickshire, England. Held by an agent of the Duke of Buccleuch, it involves a group of people from across the Knightlow Hundred inserting money into an old wayside cross.

== Ceremony ==
=== Location ===
The collection takes place at the summit of Knightlow Cross (also known as Knightlow Hill) in Ryton-on-Dunsmore, about six miles from Coventry and on the road to Daventry. The hill’s summit features an old tumulus that measures ~30-35 square feet.

The stone base of an old wayside cross lies in the center of the tumulus, measuring ~30 square inches at the top and having a hole at the centre; it is into this hole that the payments are deposited. A six-inch long mason’s mark in the shape of a cross is embedded into one side.

There are fir trees at each corner of the tumulus, which locals say represent four knights who were killed and buried there.

=== Practice ===
The hollowed-out stone base of an old wayside cross at Knightlow Cross, into which the money is traditionally inserted.

The practice takes place annually on 11 November at 6:45 AM GMT. In the leadup to the ceremony, due notice is given in the local newspapers of the 25 parishes in the Knightlow Hundred which participate. The ceremony is held by an agent of the Duke of Buccleuch and Queensberry, though sometimes by the Duke themself. Once the participants gather, the agent of the duke reads out the Charter of Assembly, which goes as follows:

Wroth silver collected at Knightlow Cross by the Duke of Buccleuch, as Lord of the Manor of the Hundreds of Knightlow.

After being called upon by the duke’s agent, representatives of the participating parishes must give money that totals 46 pence – the specific amount of pence required varying per parish – by putting the money in the hole of the cross. “Wroth Silver” is said while depositing the money. After the ceremony the attendants go to a nearby pub to have breakfast and drink hot milk and rum to the duke. Clay pipes and tobacco are provided, but are no longer smoked indoors.

The punishment for failing to participate was formerly a fine of one pound or 20 shillings per unpaid penny, or the forfeiture of a white bull with a red nose and ears. This punishment is no longer enforced.

== History ==
The ceremony is first noted within the Domesday Book of 1086, where it was recorded as ‘ongoing,’ though it is sometimes believed to date back to Norman, Saxon, Celtic, or even pre-historic times. The practice formerly existed in various locations throughout England, but now only survives in Warwickshire.

It is suggested that the practice originated from a pre-Norman invasion tax paid to feudal lords for the right to farm cattle on the land or pass cattle through nearby roads. An alternative suggestion is that the custom originated with druidic traditions requiring places to provide victims for an annual sacrifice, and the practice eventually shifted; first to animal slaughter and eventually to simple giving of money. The English Dialect Dictionary by Joseph Wright suggests that the practice is "a survival of an ancient custom of paying fees for passing over certain highways."

The Victoria History of the County of Warwick refers to wroth silver being known as "warth-penny" in 1236, and "the wroth money" in 1628. In the 19th century, wroth silver was also known as warth money and swarff penny. The 1933 edition of the Oxford English Dictionary refers to it as wroth penny.

The story of Guy of Warwick slaying the Dun Cow originates from nearby, and Dunsmore Heath (where the cow was supposedly slain) is on the path from Rugby to Knightlow Cross. A similar custom to the Wroth Silver Ceremony occurred in the New Forest in Hampshire in 1670, where “rother money” and “cattle money” was paid to manor owners for the right to graze cattle on their land.

Payment was originally given to the king, but later shifted to be given to the Duke of Buccleuch and Queensberry. The required sum was originally nine shillings and four pence, rather than the 46 pence it is today. The method of payment used to be walking thrice around the cross and saying “wroth silver” before laying it down in the cross’ hollow, but it later shifted to be the simple standing around the stone and throwing of the money as it is today.

In 1685 an attempt was made to abolish the practice, but the courts held that the ceremony was legal. Contributions were made no longer compulsory in 1800, causing the practice to go dormant. The practice was revived around 1815.

It is speculated that the forfeiture of the white bull with a red nose and ears may have been added on in 1729 by the second Duke of Montagu, who was known to love hoaxes. The fine was enforced only once during the 19th century, at the demand of the steward of Lord John Scott. The provided cattle was rejected due to not being of proper color.

Attendance varied between groups of 300 and six people across the 20th century; the group of six being during World War II. The last time the Duke of Buccleach and Queensberry attended in person was in 1975, by Richard Scott, 10th Duke of Buccleuch. The tradition has been maintained and organized by David Eadon, a resident of Rugby, Warwickshire, since 1965. Eadon was awarded the British Empire Medal for his service to the tradition in 2026.

The ceremony was not performed in 2020 due to the COVID-19 pandemic, the first time it was cancelled in 100 years.

== Etymology ==
The term wroth is an Anglo-Saxon word that is variably suggested to mean a cattle tribute, a roadway, a field, or a price, lending to the theory of the Wroth Silver Ceremony originating from a tax to pass cattle through roads. Etymological links to the word wroth, meaning 'wrathful,' have been suggested, but are considered dubious.

There is an idea that the term is derived from the word "ward," due to it being referred to as "ward-peni" during King John's time, but the persistence of the spelling "th" at the end of other historical terms for the ceremony leads this etymology to be considered doubtful.
