= Edgar Claxton =

English rail engineer (1910–2000)

Edgar Claxton MBE, FICE, FIEE, FIMechE
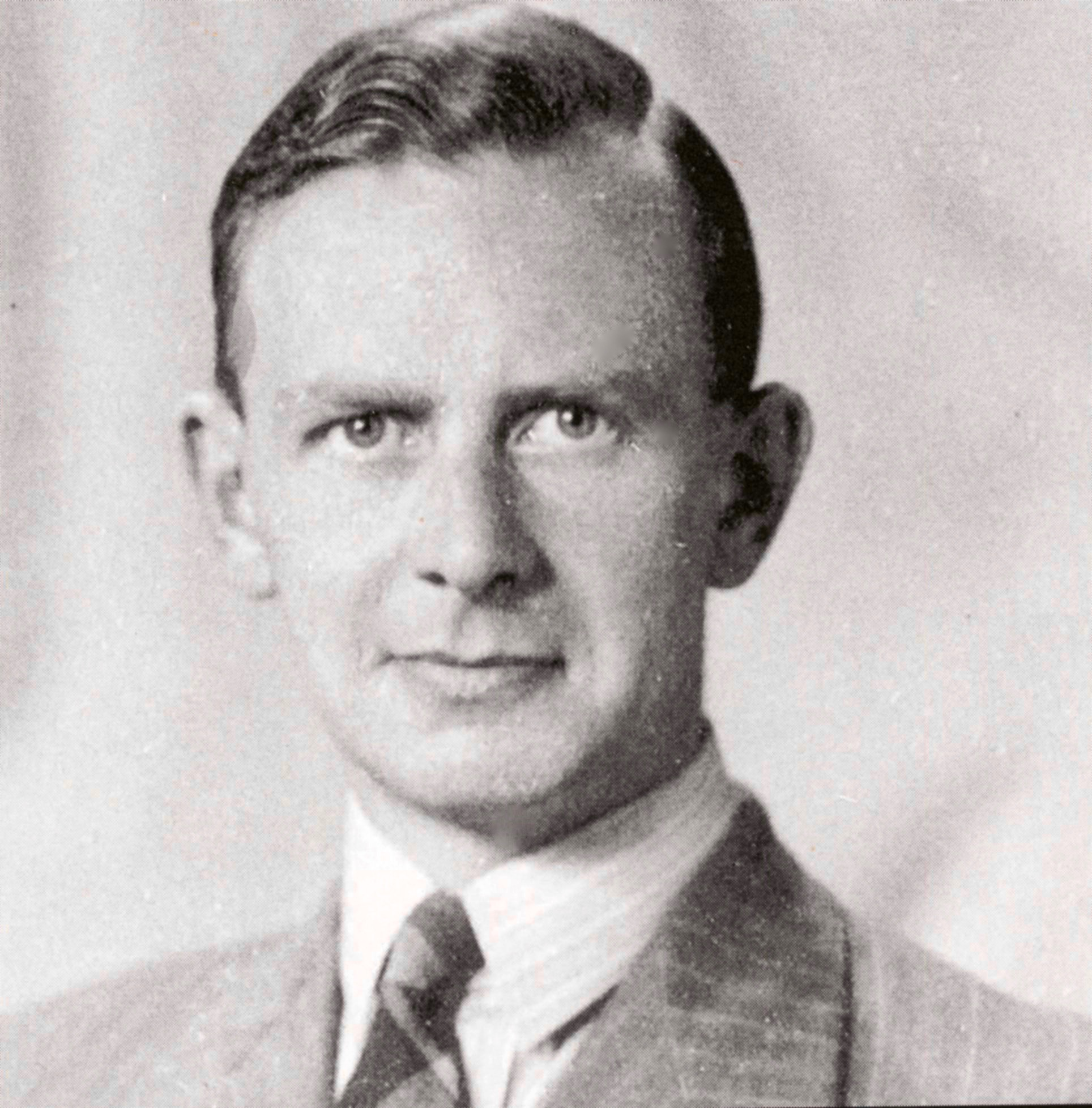
- Edgar Claxton, 1930s
- Born: 7 July 1910; Marylebone, England
- Died: 13 August 2000 (aged 90); Oxford, England
- Resting place: St Laurence churchyard, Shotteswell, Warwickshire
- Education: Merchant Taylors' School, Northwood; University College London
- Engineering career
- Institutions: Institution of Civil Engineers; Institution of Electrical Engineers; Institution of Mechanical Engineers
- Employer: British Railways Board
- Projects: Electrification of the British railway system
- Awards: M.B.E.

Edgar Claxton (7 July 1910 – 13 August 2000) was an English rail engineer. He worked for the British Railways Board and was part of the team which electrified parts of the United Kingdom's mainline railway network in the 1960s. He was responsible for "design and procurement of all the equipment, and for the electrification side of the projects". He was made an MBE in 1969 for his work.

== Background and private life ==
Edgar Claxton's parents were Edgar "Ted" Claxton, (Note: Edgar "Ted" Claxton (Marylebone 10 June 1883 – Hillingdon 5 February 1971). GRO index: Births Sep 1883 Claxton Edgar Marylebone 1a 522. Certificate says: born 19 June 1883 at 50 Charlotte Street, Marylebone. Father Jesse Claxton registrar of births and deaths, mother Mary Elizabeth nee Scales. Signed by Jesse Claxton (registrar). See File:HallamStreet 2.jpg for Charlotte Street today (since renamed Hallam Street). Deaths Mar 1971 Claxton Edgar 10 June 1883 Hillingdon 5c 848. Certificate says: 5 February 1971, Hillingdon Hospital, Hillingdon, born 10 June 1883, committee clerk retired.) and Nellie Mildred "Helen" Petty. (Note: Nellie Mildred "Helen" Petty (Hackney 20 August 1883 – Uxbridge 21 February 1945), GRO index: Births Dec 1883 Petty Nellie Mildred Hackney 1b 477. Certificate says: born 20 August 1883 at 1 Church Road, West Hackney, father George Masters Petty tithe agent, mother Emily Sophia Petty nee Hayter. Deaths Mar 1945 Claxton Nellie M. 61 Uxbridge 3a 148. Certificate says: 21 February 1945 at Fosse Way The Drive Northwood, Nellie Mildred Claxton age 61, wife of Edgar Claxton a committee clerk (LCC), her husband was present at the death.) They married on 1 August 1908, in Hammersmith. (Note: Marriage of Ted Claxton and Helen Petty. GRO index: Marriages Sep 1908 Claxton Edgar, and Petty Nellie Mildred Fulham 1a 686. Certificate says: 1 April 1908, Edgar Claxton 25 bachelor assistant settlement officer St Marylebone, address 13 Hallam Street St Marylebone, father Jesse Claxton registrar of births and deaths. Nellie Mildred Petty was 24, spinster, address 61 Godolphin Road, father George Masters Petty, surveyor. Married at Church of St Thomas (Anglican), Hammersmith. Witnesses George Masters Petty, Jesse Claxton, E.S. Petty, M.E. Claxton.) Ted was a poor law settlement officer, working around the country from the offices of St Marylebone Workhouse. (Note: "Settlement" in this context refers to a requirement that a parish supports its registered poor. The Poor Law Amendment Act 1834 repealed previous settlement laws, and replaced them with the idea of workhouses.) At the same time he was registrar for births and deaths for Marylebone parish, working from an office in his home, as did his father Jesse. Helen was a music teacher, and the honorary piano accompanist for the Northwood Choral Society. A year after Helen's death, Ted Claxton married Mary Browning Eustance in Edmonton on 24 April 1946. (Note: Mary Browning Eustance (1887–1966). GRO index: Births Mar 1887 Eustance Mary Browning Altrincham 8a 186, Marriages Jun 1946 Eustance, Mary B. and Claxton, Edgar Edmonton 3a 2261. Marriage certificate says: "April 24th 1946", Edgar Claxton age 62 widower local government official retired of Fosse Way, The Drive, Northwood, Edgar's father was Jesse Claxton local government officer deceased. Mary Browning Eustance was 59, spinster, secretary, of 5 Birchwood (Lane?) Muswell Hill, father Edward Eustance jeweller retired. Married at St James Muswell Hill by a prebendiary of St Paul's Cathedral. Deaths Mar 1966 Claxton Mary B. 79 Hammersmith 5B 799.)

Edgar Claxton was born in Marylebone on 7 July 1910, and died in Oxford on 13 August 2000. (Note: Edgar Claxton (Marylebone 7 July 1910 – Oxford 13 August 2000). GRO index: Births Dec 1910 Claxton Edgar Marylebone 1a 413. The certificate says: born 7 July 1910 at 93 Hallam Street, Marylebone, father Edgar Claxton, mother Nellie Mildred Claxton nee Petty, father was settlement officer for Marylebone. Signed by Edgar Claxton senior (registrar). Deaths Sep 2000 Claxton Edgar 7 Ju 1910 age 90 Oxford 7021A 270. Certificate says: 31 August 2000 at Oxford, Edgar Claxton born 7 July 1910 St Marylebone railway electrification engineer retired.) He first appeared in the newspapers at the age of two years, having attended a family wedding. He attended Merchant Taylors' School, Northwood, and in 1939 he gained First Class Honours in engineering at University College London. On 11 July 1928, soon after Claxton's 18th birthday, a motor car driven by Edgar Claxton of Roy Road, Northwood, (Note: Incorrectly written as Edward Claxton, but with the correct address in the Uxbridge and West Drayton Gazette) who had "driven for a year, and previously driven a motor cycle", was involved in a collision with a motor cycle in Northwood. The pillion rider of the motorcycle, 19-year-old Beatrice Davis, died. At the inquest of 20 July 1928 it was found that the car had stopped before the impact, the motor cyclist had been driving too fast, and that Edgar Claxton was "exonerated from all blame". The verdict was "accidental death".

Between 1952 and 1975 Claxton was living at 47 Grange Gardens, Pinner. He married Elizabeth "Betty" Welsh. (Note: Elizabeth "Betty" Welsh (1910–1986). GRO index: Deaths 1986 Claxton Elizabeth Welsh 14 No 1910 Banbury 02.86 20 2672.) They had several children. In 1996 he was the sponsor and main benefactor to St Laurence Church, Shotteswell, Warwickshire, when the six bells of the church were matched, re-tuned and re-hung, following long disuse. He is buried in Shotteswell churchyard.

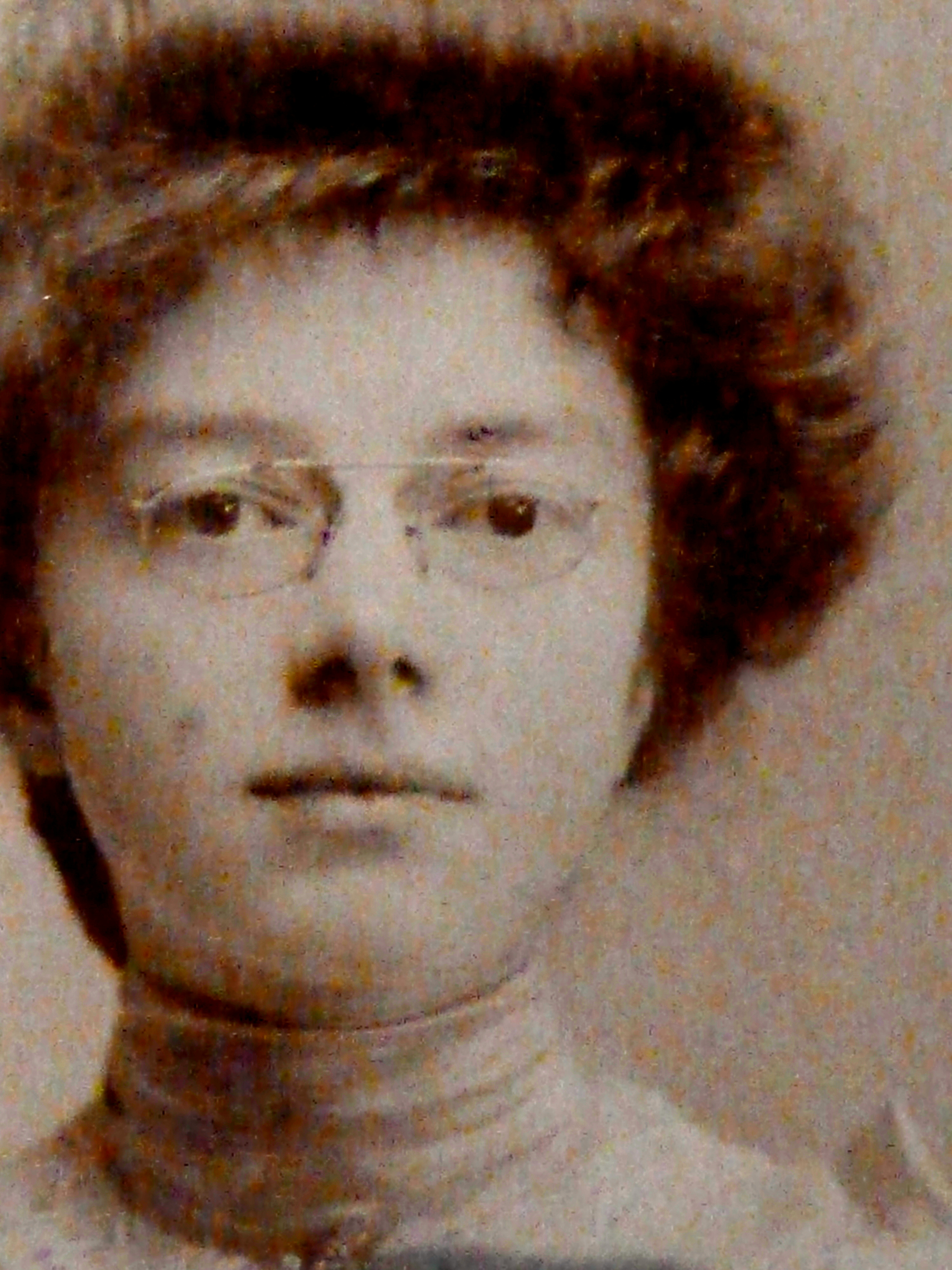
Claxton's mother, Helen Claxton, 1904

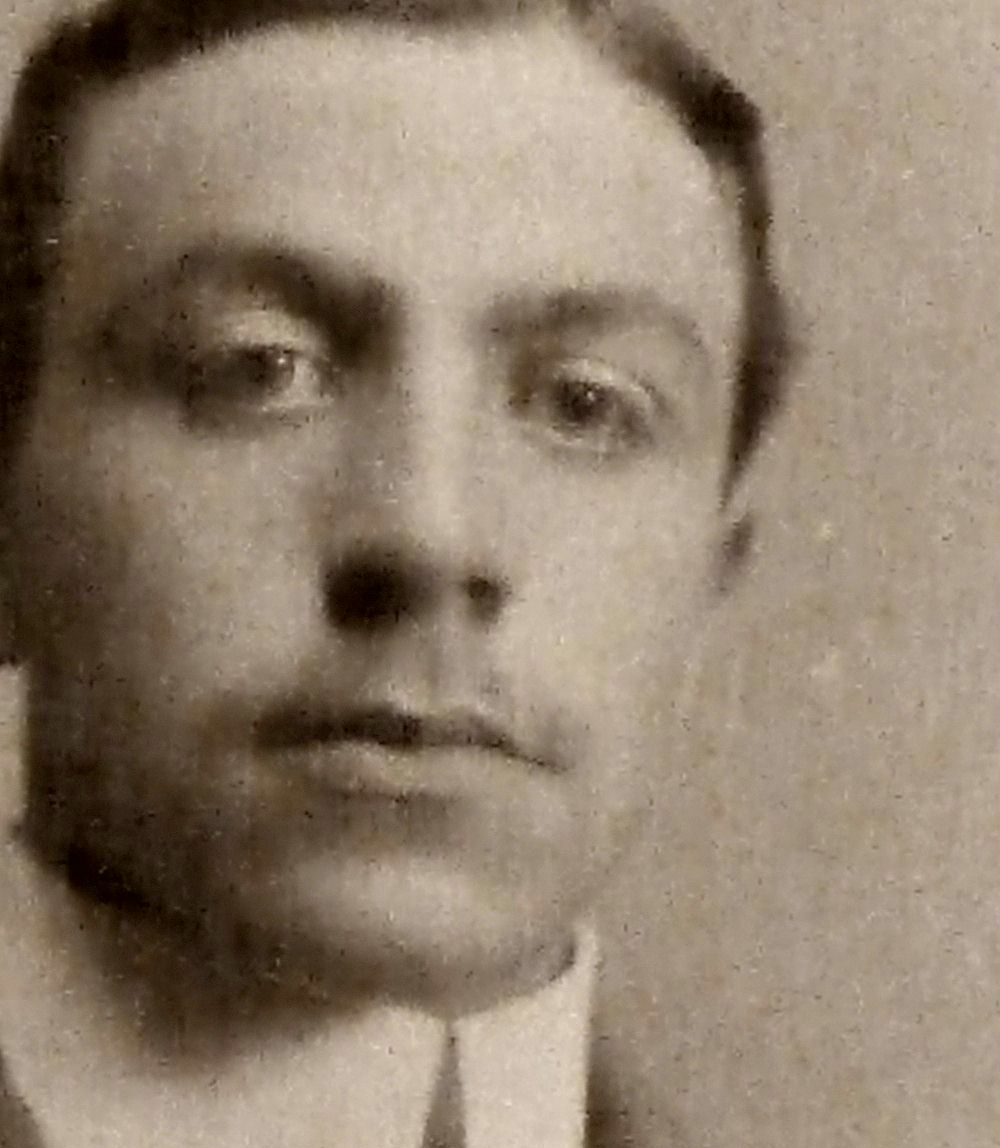
Claxton's father, Ted Claxton, 1904

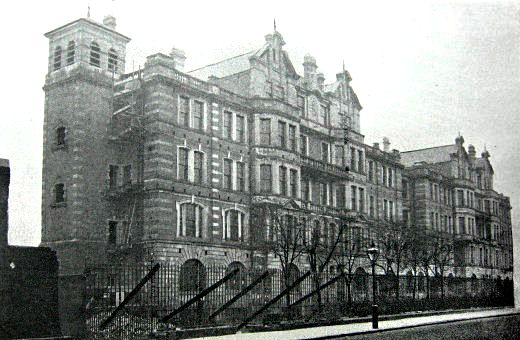
St Marylebone Workhouse. Edgar Claxton's father worked in the offices here

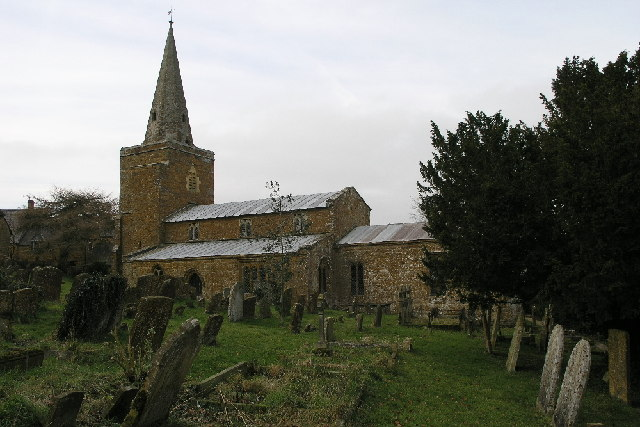
St Laurence Shotteswell, where Claxton is buried

== Career ==
=== Early career ===
Claxton's first employment was with the engineering firm Kennedy & Donkin. This involved him with projects "mostly for generating and sub-stations, overhead lines and cables", including work in Northern Ireland and "construction of the National Grid in Scotland". In 1937 Claxton became a technical assistant, appointed by Sir Nigel Gresley to the London North Eastern Railway (LNER). This appointment involved "dealing with power supply and 33kV distribution systems and associated equipment for the impending Manchester–Sheffield and Liverpool Street–Sheffield electrical systems, (Note: These two projects were postponed until after World War II) and other works". In 1939 he was living in lodgings with other LNER staff at 11 North Road, Glossop, describing himself as a civil and electrical engineer, LNER traction staff.

=== World War II ===
As an essential railway worker he did not do military service in World War II. Instead, he worked for the Admiralty Dockyard Department. Here, he "looked after planning, specifications and contracts for electrical distribution systems for dock works both at home and abroad".

=== Later career ===
After the war, Claxton was again employed by LNER as senior technical assistant in the Electric Traction Section, "handling contracts for electric locomotives and rolling stock", developing diesel and electric shunting locomotives. He was involved in running trials in Zeist, Utrecht, for some years, (Note: This area was always referred to as being "in Holland" in sources relating to Claxton's work there, although it is not in the modern provinces North Holland and South Holland; see Johnson (2018)) with respect to Gresley's prototype electrical locomotive Tommy, LNER no.6701.

By the end of 1951, Claxton was the assistant electrification engineer for the MSW electrification scheme, based at Dukinfield, "supervising all branches of the MSW electrification project from end to end", including Scotland. He was working with Metropolitan Vickers & Co., "installing electrical equipment into the newly formed fleet of locomotives for the re-started 1936 programme", i.e. the project plans in which he had been involved before the war. From 1952, Claxton was the assistant electrical engineer (development), for the chief electrical engineer's department, British Railways central staff, British Transport Commission (BTC). Following pioneer electrification of the Aix-les-Bains to La Roche-sur-Foron line, and the Valenciennes to Thionville line in 1954, the BTC asked Edgar Claxton to chair a "committee to review electrification strategy for main lines".

He read a paper at the British Railways Electrification Conference in 1960. He "was part of the team setting up the first overhead wires for electrification of the mainline railway and was involved in the project commemorated" in the British Railways booklet, Change at Crewe (1960). This brochure details "the completion of Stage One, Manchester-Crewe of the Manchester-Liverpool-Euston Electrification Scheme".

By 1969, Claxton was the fixed equipment projects engineer for the British Railways Board. He was "involved in all British Railway electrification projects throughout the country, and [was] responsible for the design and procurement of all the equipment, and for the electrification side of the projects". E.M. Johnson (2018) says:

By the time of his retirement in 1975, Claxton had attained a post with the British Railways Board of Mechanical and Electrical Engineering (Electrification). Working with BR(LMR) he was therefore at the forefront of the biggest electrification schemes, both main line and suburban, of the 1950s and 1960s – notably the Manchester–Crewe and West Coast–Crewe to Euston and Crewe to Glasgow projects as well as such precursors as the Lancaster–Morecambe–Heysham ac experiments and those on the Colchester–Clacton–Walton and the Styal lines.

=== Retirement work ===
Following his 1975 retirement, Claxton became a Transmark consultant. He was "heavily involved" in the electrification aspect of the design of the Channel Tunnel (with which he had had links since the 1950s) and in the railway electrification systems of Brazil, Romania and Finland.

=== Awards and institutions ===
In 1946 when Claxton was living in Bath, he was elected an Associate of the Institution of Mechanical Engineers, and later became a FIMechE. He was a Fellow of the Institution of Civil Engineers (FICE), (Note: He became an associate (now Member level) of ICE on 9 March 1937, and a member (now Fellow grade) in 1959: information from Institution of Civil Engineers library.) and a Fellow of the Institution of Electrical Engineers (FIEE). For his work he was made MBE in the 1969 Birthday Honours of Elizabeth II.

== Claxton's team's overhead lines in 1960 ==
According to Claxton's Overhead Line Equipment paper of 1960, the lines included in the electrification plan were: Manchester–Crewe; Liverpool–Crewe; Crewe-Euston; Colchester–Clacton–Walton; Liverpool Street–Chelmsford–Southend; Liverpool Street–Enfield–Chingford–Hertford–Bishop's Stortford; London–Tilbury–Southend; Glasgow Suburban Stage I; Chelmsford–Colchester.

Claxton and his team faced and resolved a number of challenges to the installation of the overhead electrification system. Overhead lines were considered less dangerous and more convenient than an electrified third rail which could not be used on level crossings and in the rail yards. However, there was dense traffic at speeds of up to 100 mph (160 km/h) on the above routes and the trains would have to leave the main tracks when not in use. There was often little room between the train roofs and the bridges, bridges could not always be raised, and lowering the track level below bridges was not always feasible. The damp British atmosphere threatened to facilitate corrosion in electrical installations, while maintenance costs had to be limited.

Where tunnels could not be adapted for space, lower-voltage equipment was fitted in. "Welded-and-braced portal structures and extensive trials with tubular structures" formed part of the solution for carrying the equipment. They spent a lot on compound structures, non-ferrous fittings and special insulators to protect equipment from weathering and air pollution, making it safe for fast trains. Where there had to be neutral sections and gaps in electrification, special equipment was designed for the transition between differing power supplies. Regarding this challenge, Claxton said in 1960, "Section insulators of high performance have been provided and advanced high-speed bi-directional designs have now been developed". At that stage in 1960, the team was investigating "less expensive galvanised live-side fittings, simple high-speed sectioning devices and the use of glass-fibre and toughened glass". They were aiming to save construction and maintenance costs, and simplify the design, while making sure that the equipment would work properly and last well.

In October 1960, Ernest Marples said, "It will be the technical advances that will decide the attraction of rail travel in the future. There is the news of the Manchester-Crewe electrification. There is the news of the Kent electrification, which has brought about a 36 per cent. increase in passengers over the previous steam traction".

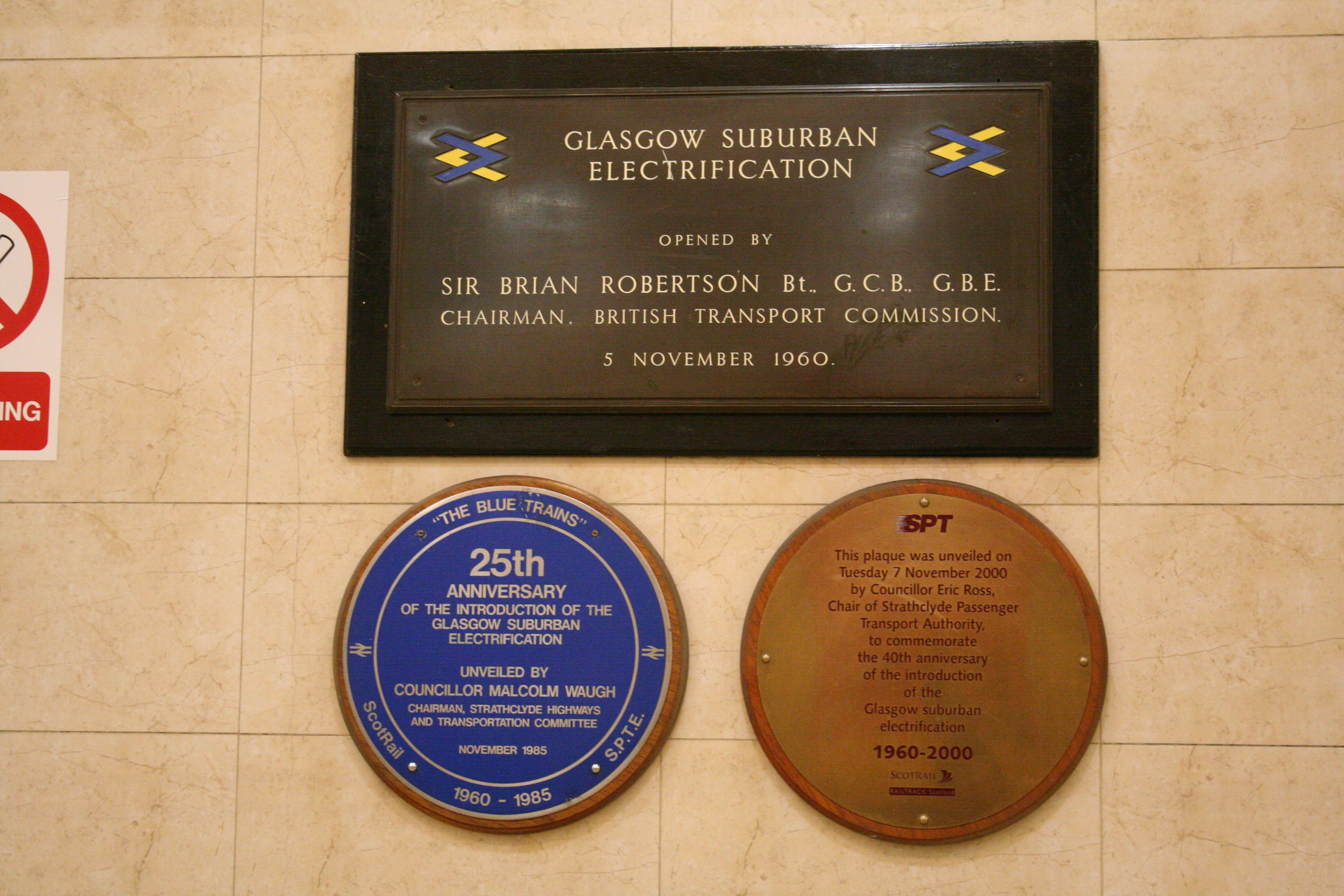
Plaques commemorating electrification at Glasgow, 1960

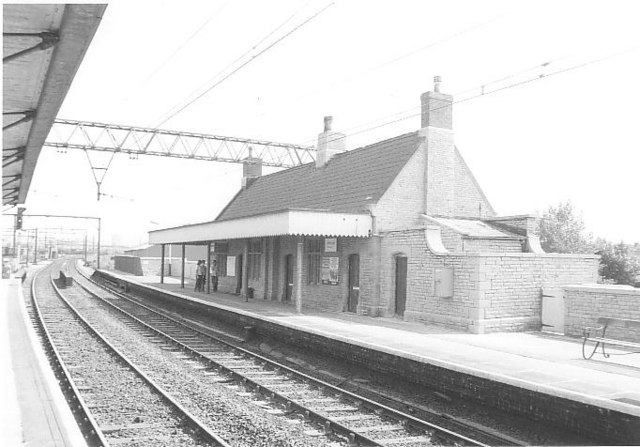
Electrification portals and overhead lines at Ashburys railway station, 1977

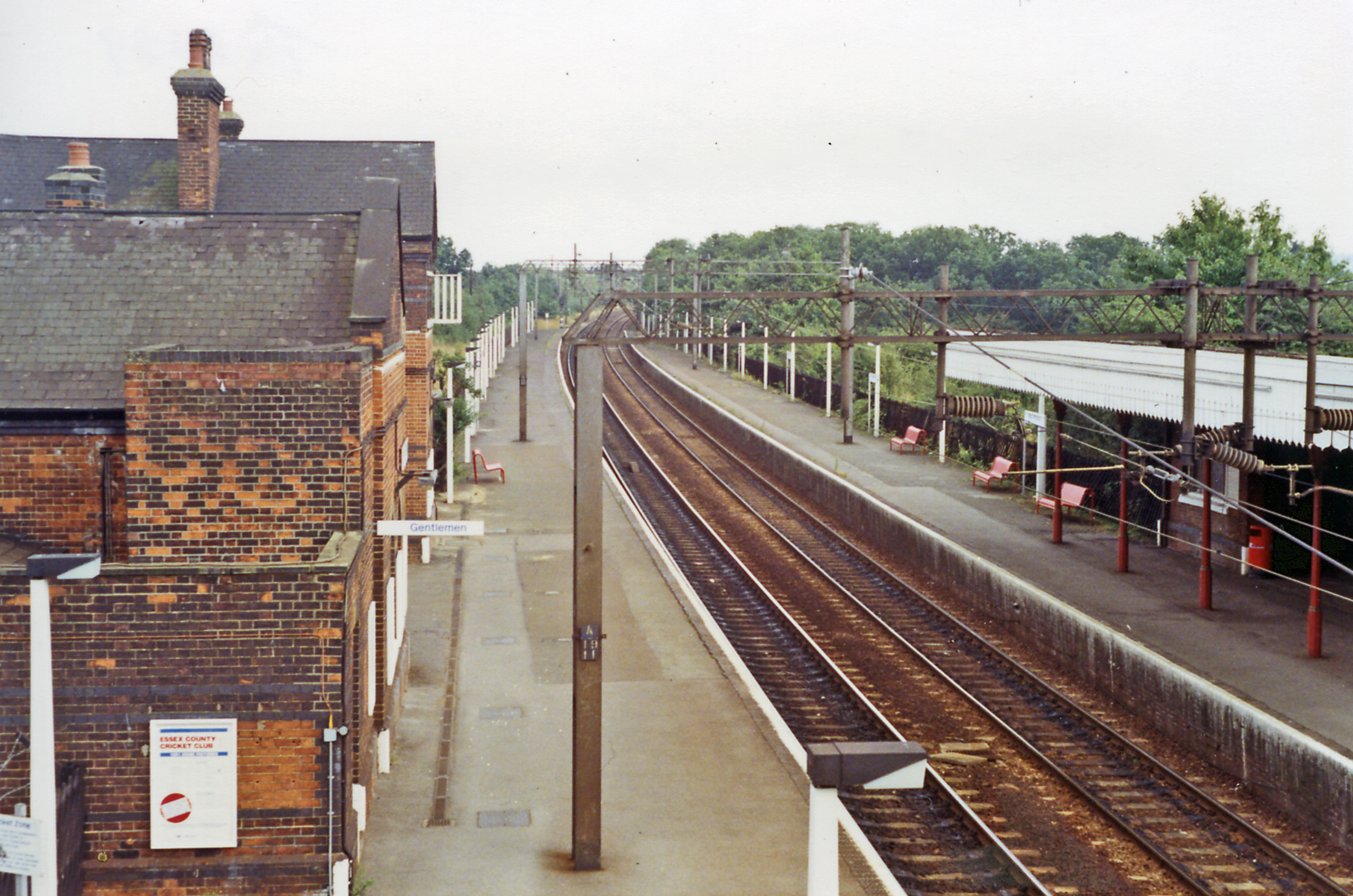
West Horndon railway station with 1962 overhead lines

== See also ==
- Railway electrification in Great Britain
