= Hemlingford Hundred =

One of four hundreds of Warwickshire, England

Coordinates: 52.5°N 1.75°W

Hemlingford Hundred was one of the four hundreds that the English county of Warwickshire was divided into, along with Kington, Knightlow and Barlichway. It was recorded in the Domesday Book under the name of Coleshill.

At the time of the Domesday Survey this hundred was known as 'Coleshelle' Hundred and its meeting-place was at Coleshill; it is first called by its present name of Hemlingford Hundred in the Pipe Roll of 8 Henry II (1161–2).

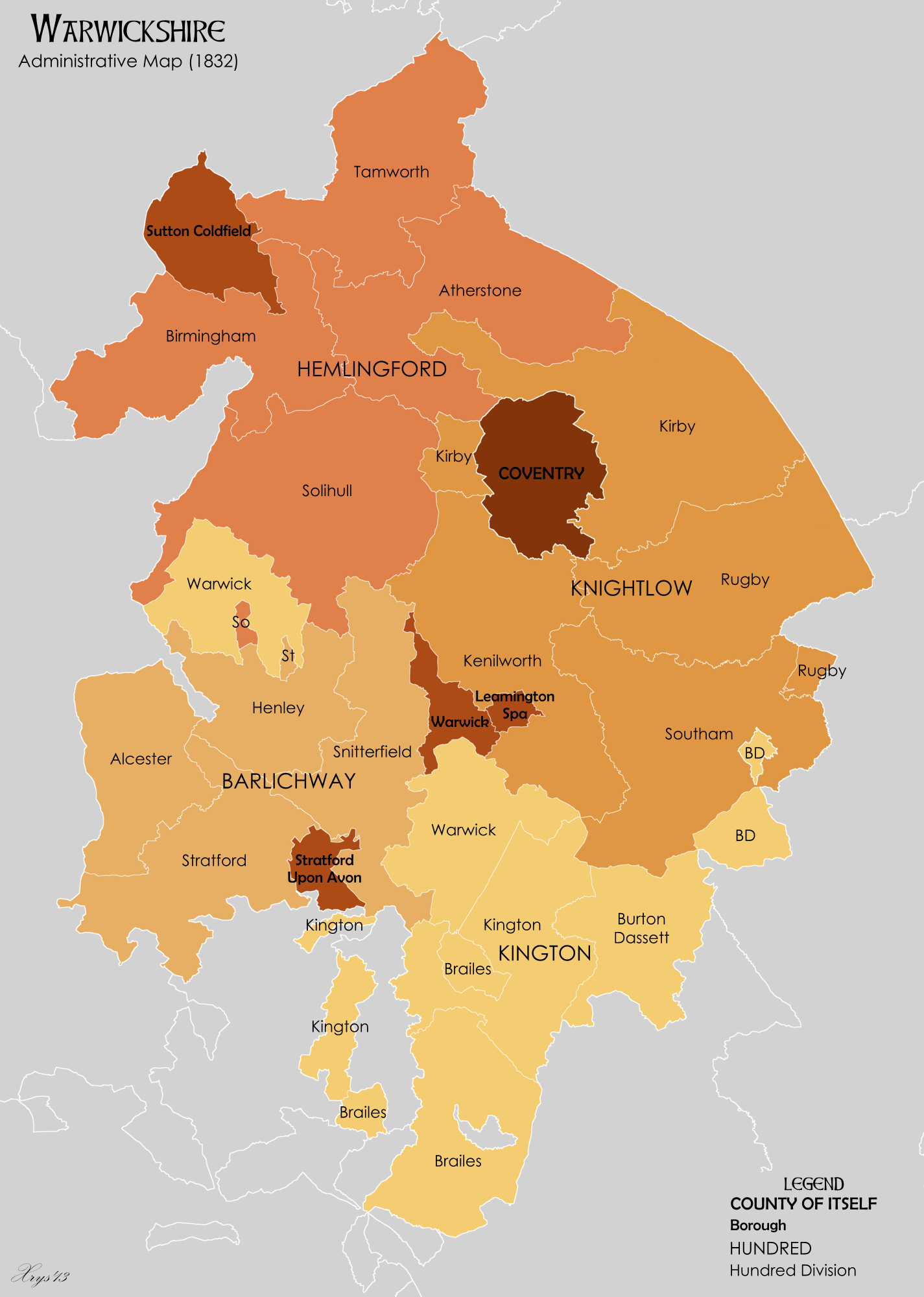
Warwickshire in 1832

The hundred covered northern Warwickshire, including Birmingham, Nuneaton, Solihull and Tamworth. It was under the governance of several peers including the Lord of Packington Hall and Lord of Hermitage Manor with accompanying Stewards.

It was itself sub-divided into four subdivisions, those of Atherstone, Birmingham, Solihull and Tamworth.

The Atherstone subdivision comprised 15 parishes and 4 townships and chapelries: Ansley, Baxterley, Caldecote, Chilvers Coton, Corley, Fillongley, Lea Marston, Mancetter, Atherstone, Hartshill, Maxstoke, Merevale, Nuneaton, Attleborough, Stockingford, Shustoke, Weddington, Whitacre Nether and Whitacre Over.

== See also ==
- Tomsaete
