= National Herb Centre =

Coordinates: 52.1210°N 1.3984°W

The National Herb Centre is a herbarium and garden centre located in Warmington, Warwickshire, England. The centre was opened in 1997 by Peter Turner, former chairman of the British Herb Trade Association. As well as being a place of research and learning there is a cafe, bistro, shops and a nature trail. Guided tours are available in the summer and there is no charge to visit the centre.
