= Arlescote =

Village in Warwickshire, England

Coordinates: 52.1345°N 01.4316°W

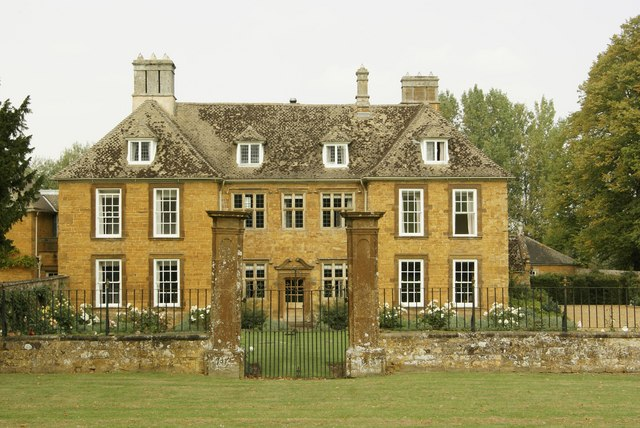
- Arlescote House

- Location within Warwickshire
- Population: 30 (approx)
- OS grid reference: SP3948
- Civil parish: Warmington
- District: Stratford on Avon
- Shire county: Warwickshire
- Region: West Midlands
- Country: England
- Sovereign state: United Kingdom
- Post town: BANBURY
- Postcode district: OX17
- Dialling code: 01295
- Police: Warwickshire
- Fire: Warwickshire
- Ambulance: West Midlands

Arlescote is a village in Warwickshire, England.

Arlescote forms part of the district of Stratford-on-Avon and the civil parish of Warmington. This small hamlet sits approximately 2 miles (3.2 km) away from Warmington at the bottom of Edgehill, with roughly 10 houses and 30 villagers today. Without any shops or other local conveniences situated in the hamlet, the main feature is Arlescote House, a Grade II* James I house of architectural and historic interest.

== Location ==
Arlescote is in the county of Warwickshire, England, despite the hamlet's postcode (OX17 1DQ). Arlescote is part of the parish of Warmington and is on the north-facing side of Edgehill. Nearby towns include Banbury, and Leamington Spa. Arlescote is fairly remote, with the nearest village being 2 miles away. Arlescote is at one of the northernmost points of the Cotswolds AONB. A public footpath runs through the village.

== History ==
As part of the parish of Warmington, Arlescote shares much of its history with the nearby villages of Warmington and Ratley. Originally Arlescote began as little more than the manor house and surrounding farmland. During the late 10th century, the land was held by the Norman Abbey of Préaux. Arelscote was given to the abbey by the Count of Meulan's father, Roger de Beaumont, and confirmed by William the Conqueror c. 1080. When the count's brother, Earl of Warwick, succeeded his sibling, he also gave the village of Warmington to the abbey. During the 14th century, the "priory" seems to have disbanded and the parish passed into the control of the prior of Toft monks. During the war with France, the parish was passed in and out of the possession of the king. In 1542, Arlescote was granted to Richard Andrews and Leonard Chamberlain, who quickly passed the land on to the Lecke family. The house fell into the possession of John Croker of Hook Norton who subsequently passed the land on to his son Gerard following his death. In 1572, Warmington and Arlescote's manor houses were sold to Richard and Thomas Cupper. Following Richard's death around 1605, his son Henry Cupper (or Cooper, as the name had now become) gave Warmington manor to his second son Thomas. Both Alrescote House and Warmington Manor were then passed down through the Cooper family. In 1642 the Battle of Edgehill took place as the first battle of the first English Civil War. The battle itself took place very near to Arlescote, with battle reenactments still taking place today in nearby countryside. The next known owner of Warmington manor was William Bumpstead in 1743. By 1764 the house was owned by Robert Child, a wealthy banker. Child's daughter Sarah and her husband John then took ownership of the manor in 1787. Their daughter Sarah Sophia and her husband, Earl of Jersey, then became lord of the manor around 1806. Following the earl's death in 1859, Mr and Mrs Bennet became lord and lady of Warmington manor until 1924. Since this time the manorial rights appear to have fallen through.

Arlescote Manor has been redeveloped by its current owners who bought the house in the mid-2000s. The village community also rebuilt a dry-stone wall on the east side of the village in 2000 as a millennium community project.
