= George Augustus =

Multiple people share the name George Augustus:

- George Baldwin Augustus, politician in Mississippi
- George Augustus Eliott, 1st Baron Heathfield
- George Augustus Sala
- George Augustus Selwyn, bishop.
- George II of Great Britain was earlier known as Prince George Augustus
- George IV of the United Kingdom's full name was George Augustus Frederick
