= Sanderson Miller =

British architect

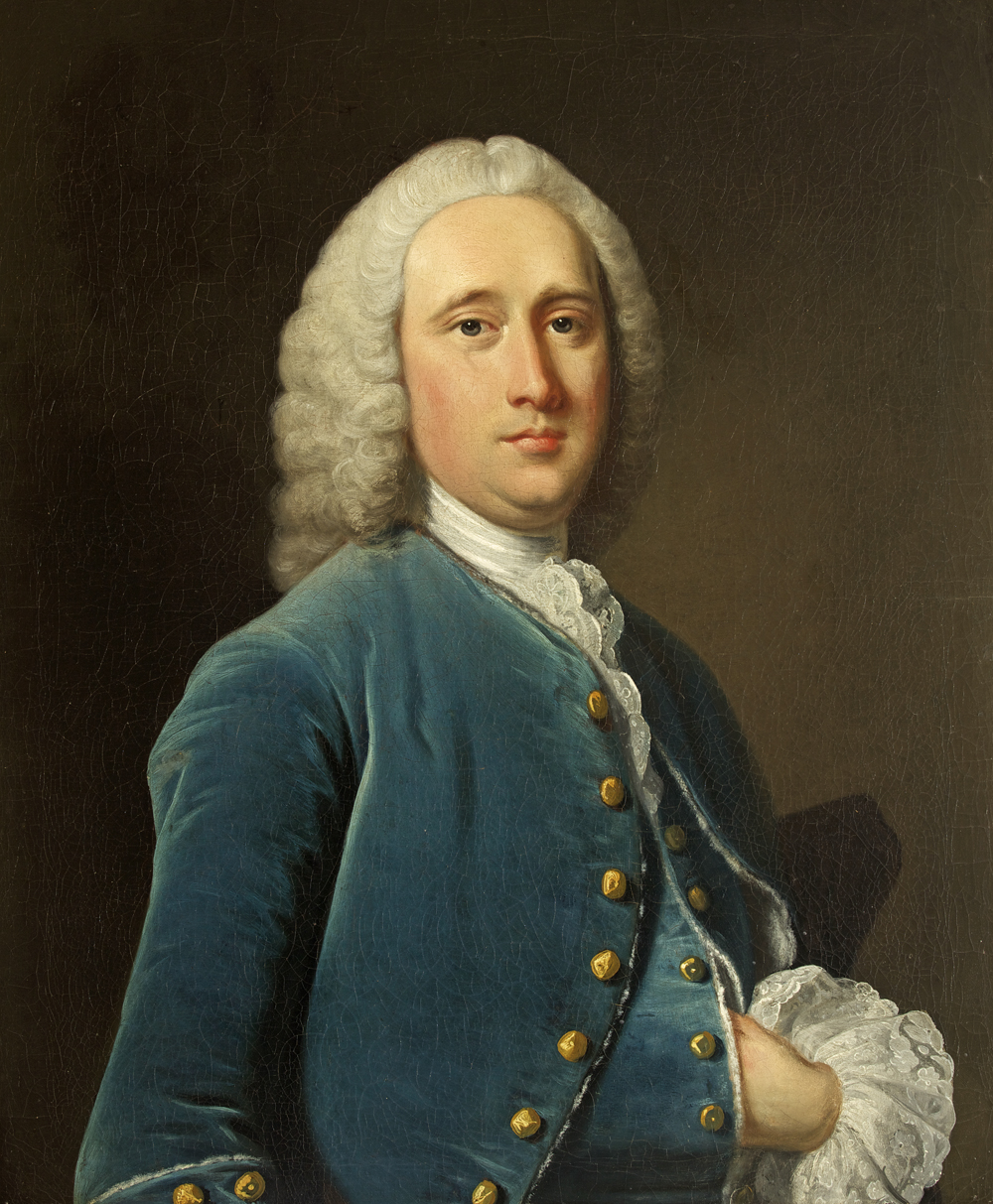
- portrait c. 1750
- Born: 1716; Radway, England, Great Britain
- Died: 23 April 1780 (aged 63–64); Radway, England, Great Britain
- Children: 5 daughters and 1 son

Sanderson Miller (1716 – 23 April 1780) was an English pioneer of Gothic revival architecture and landscape designer. He is noted for adding follies or other Picturesque garden buildings and features to the grounds of an estate.

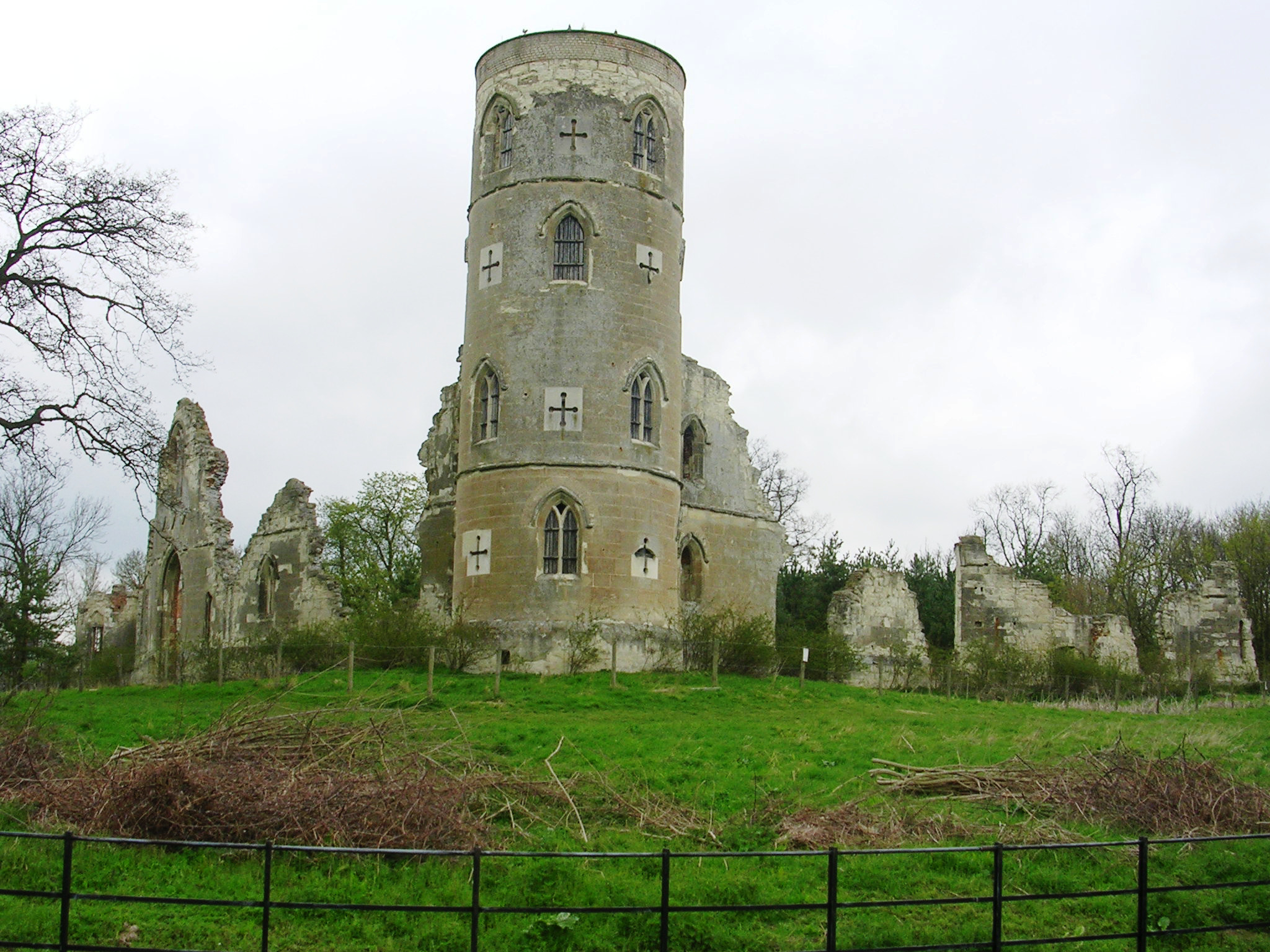
Wimpole's Folly, a mock semi-ruined castle designed by Miller, on the grounds of Wimpole Hall, Cambridgeshire

== Early life ==
Miller was the son of a wool merchant of the same name, High Sheriff of Warwickshire in 1728, who died in 1737. He was born, lived and died at Radway, on the Warwickshire estate bought by his father in 1712.

At the age of 15, Miller was already interested in antiquarian subjects. While studying at St Mary Hall, Oxford he continued to develop his interest in England's past, under the influence of William King. He inherited Radway Grange when he was 21, and a few years later started to redesign the Elizabethan house in a Gothic style.

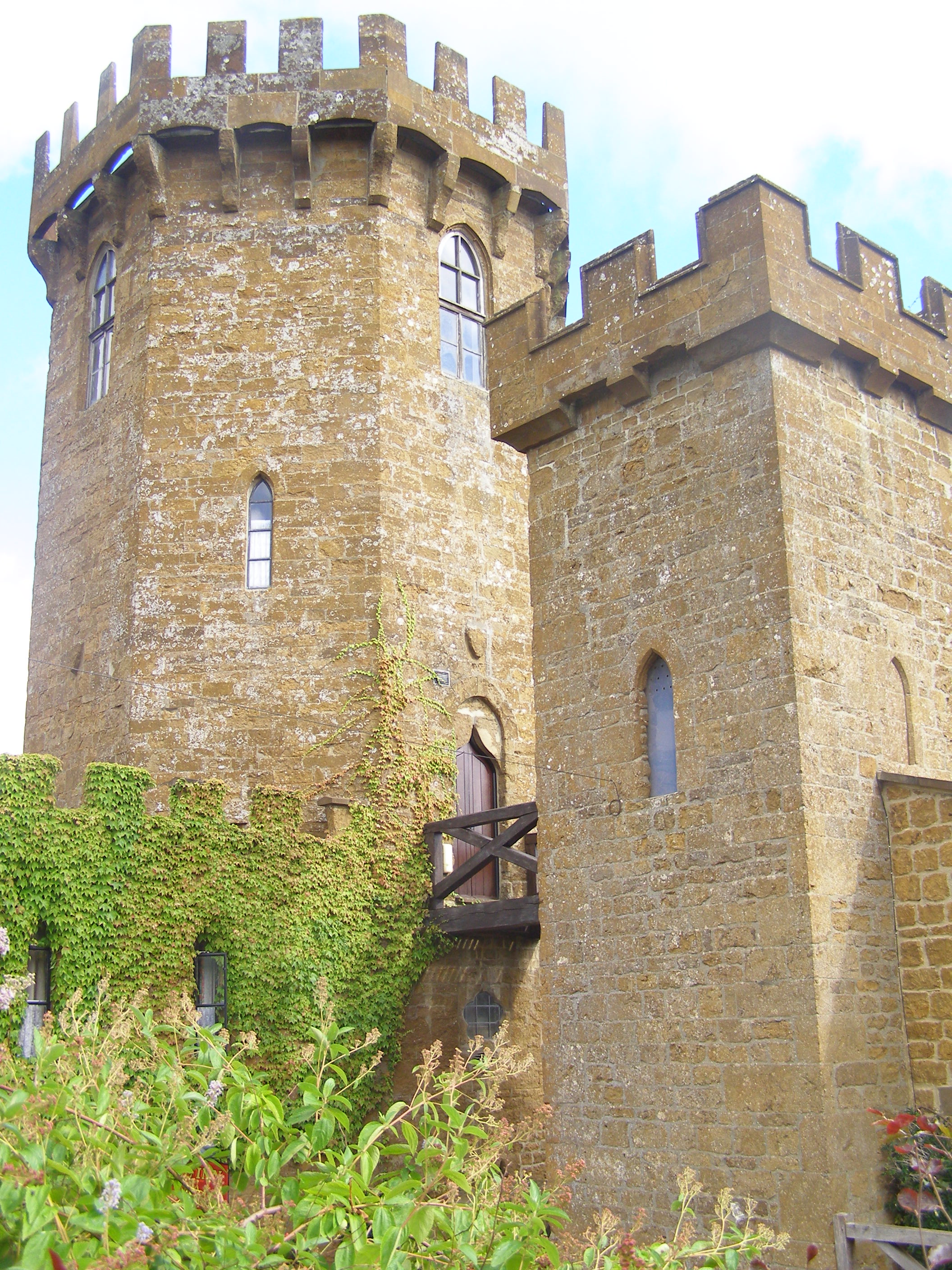
The Octagonal Tower at Edge Hill, Warwickshire

On the grounds he added a thatched cottage and octagonal tower based on Guy's Tower at Warwick Castle. The tower not only evoked the past visually through its medieval design but it also had strong historical associations of other kinds. For instance, it was intended to house a statue of Caractacus and was sited on the spot traditionally associated with the king raising the standard before the Battle of Edgehill.

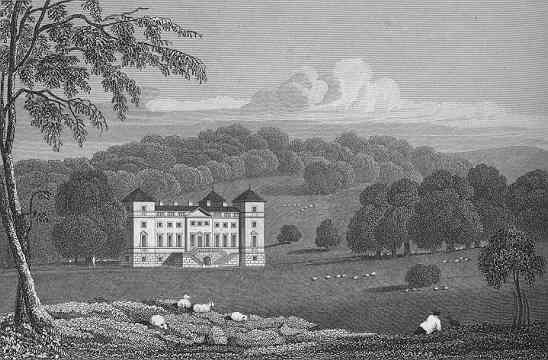
Hagley Hall in Worcestershire, where George Lyttelton insisted on a classical style for the main house. Miller landscaped the grounds and added a Gothic "ruined" castle.

== Patronage and developments ==
This work at Radway established Miller's reputation as a gentleman, or amateur, architect and landscape designer. His wide social circle, and contacts developed through his patron George Lyttelton, 1st Baron Lyttelton, led to many requests for his designs. He produced some classical buildings like the Shire Hall in Warwick and Hagley Hall, Worcestershire, but he is more often associated with Gothic revival work, such as Albury Hall, Oxfordshire and the Great Hall at Lacock Abbey. He is especially known for the evocative mock "ruined" castles he created at Hagley, Wimpole Hall and Ingestre Hall, Staffordshire, though this last has since been demolished. Other places to which he contributed include Farnborough Hall, Wroxton Abbey, Upton House, Sham Castle, Siston Court and Tudor Court, Hanworth Park, the surviving part of a Royal hunting lodge used by Henry VIII.

== Family ==
Miller married Susanna, daughter of Edward Trotman (Note: Dickins and Stanton claim that Susanna's father was named Samuel.) and they had six children: Fiennes, Charles, Susanna, Mary, Hester and Anna.

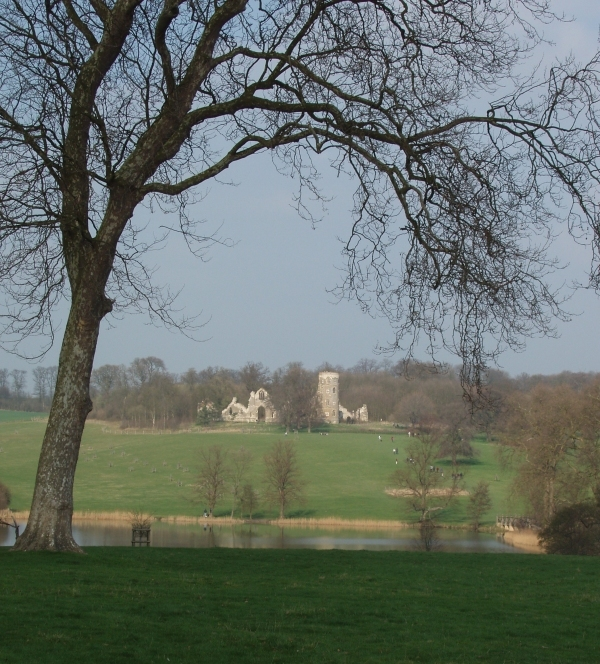
The Wimpole Hall mock castle in its setting

== Gallery of work ==
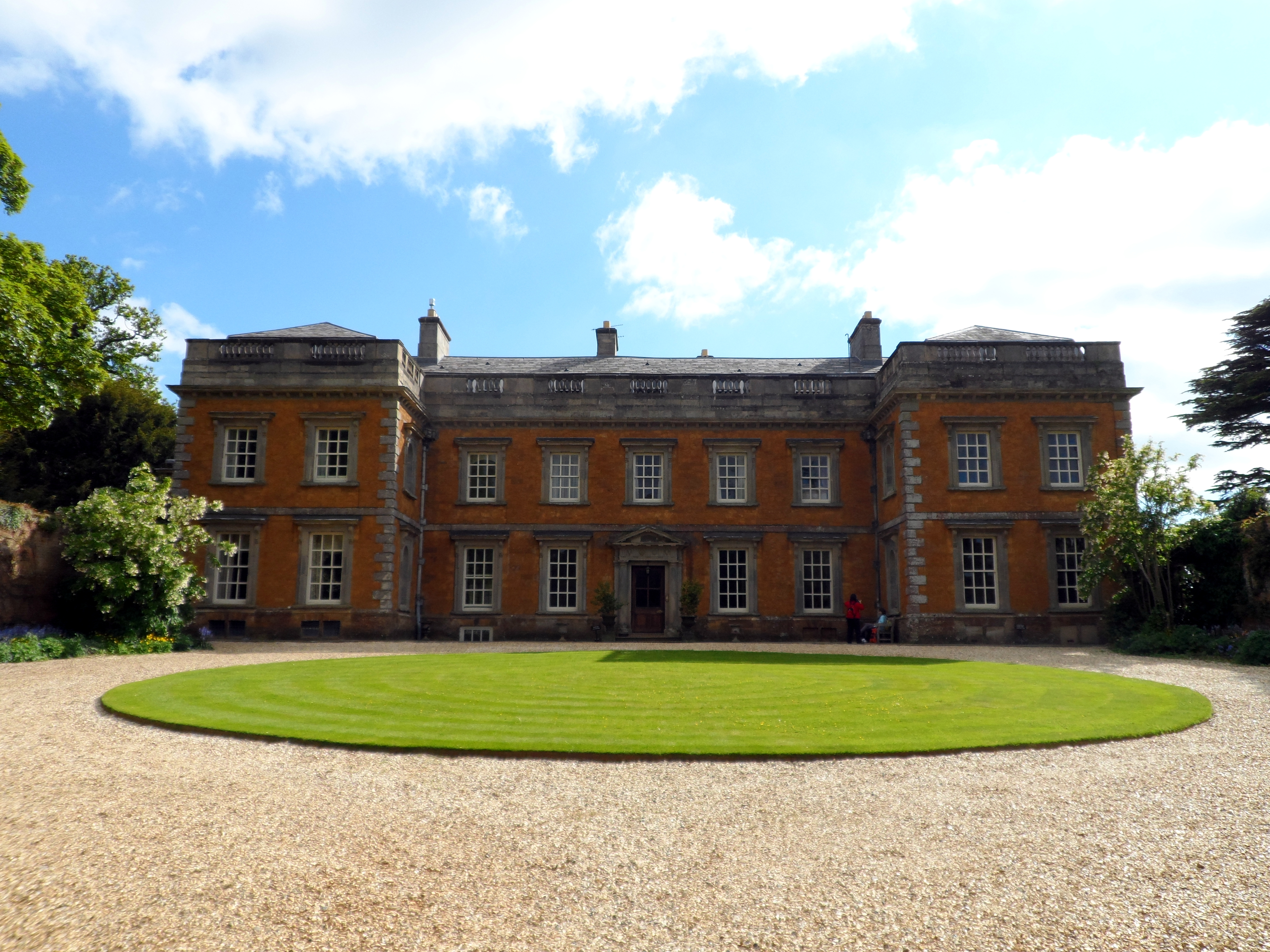
Farnborough Hall, Warwickshire

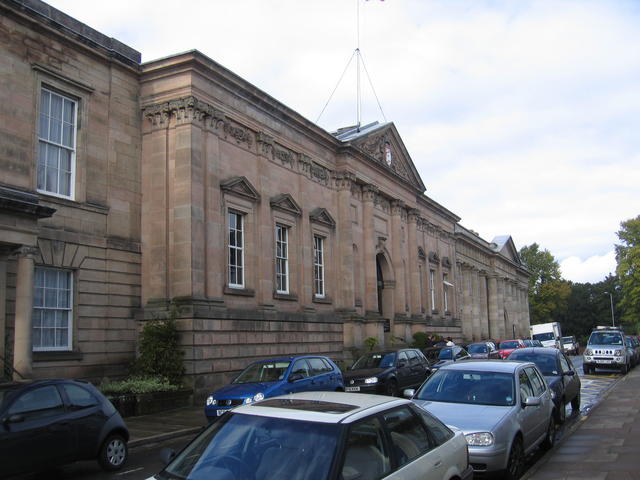
Shire Hall, Warwick

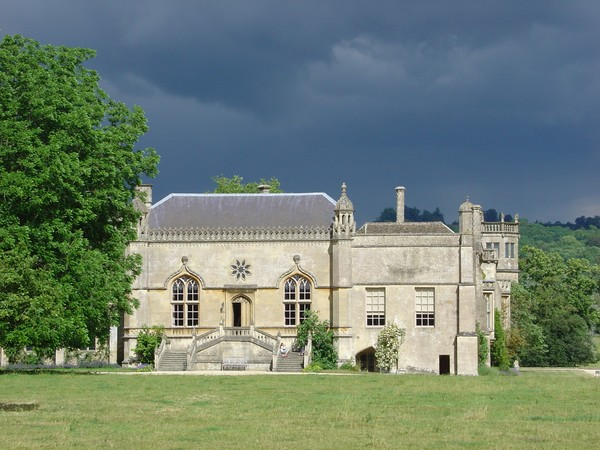
Lacock Abbey, Wiltshire, Sanderson's Great Hall on left

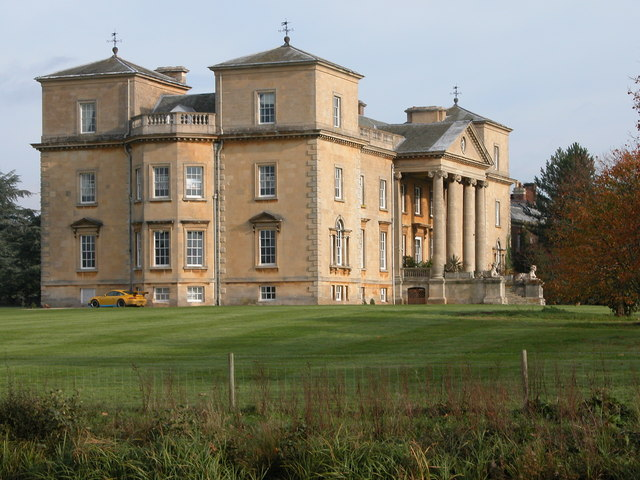
Croome Court, Worcestershire

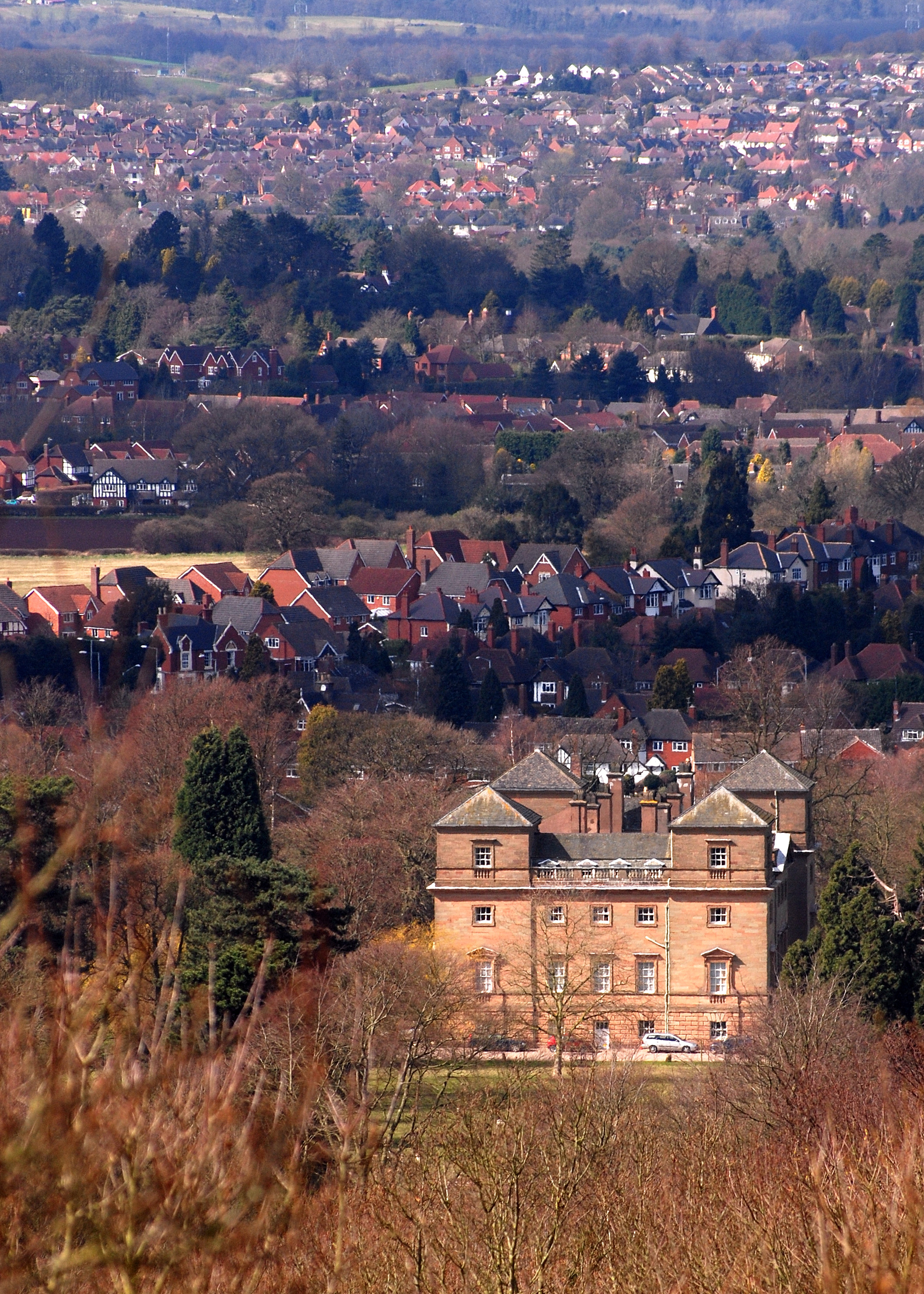
Hagley Hall, Worcestershire

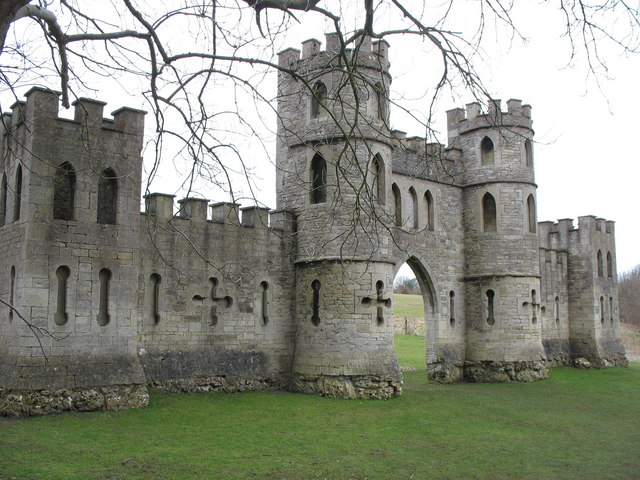
Ralph Allen's sham castle overlooking Bath

== Sources ==
- William Hawkes, The Diaries of Sanderson Miller (Dugdale 2005)
