= Barlichway Hundred =

Historical division of Warwickshire, England

Coordinates: 52.2°N 1.8°W

Barlichway Hundred or Barlinchway Hundred was a historic hundred of the county of Warwickshire in England. It covered the west of the county, including Stratford-upon-Avon, Alcester, Henley in Arden, Bidford on Avon and Honiley.

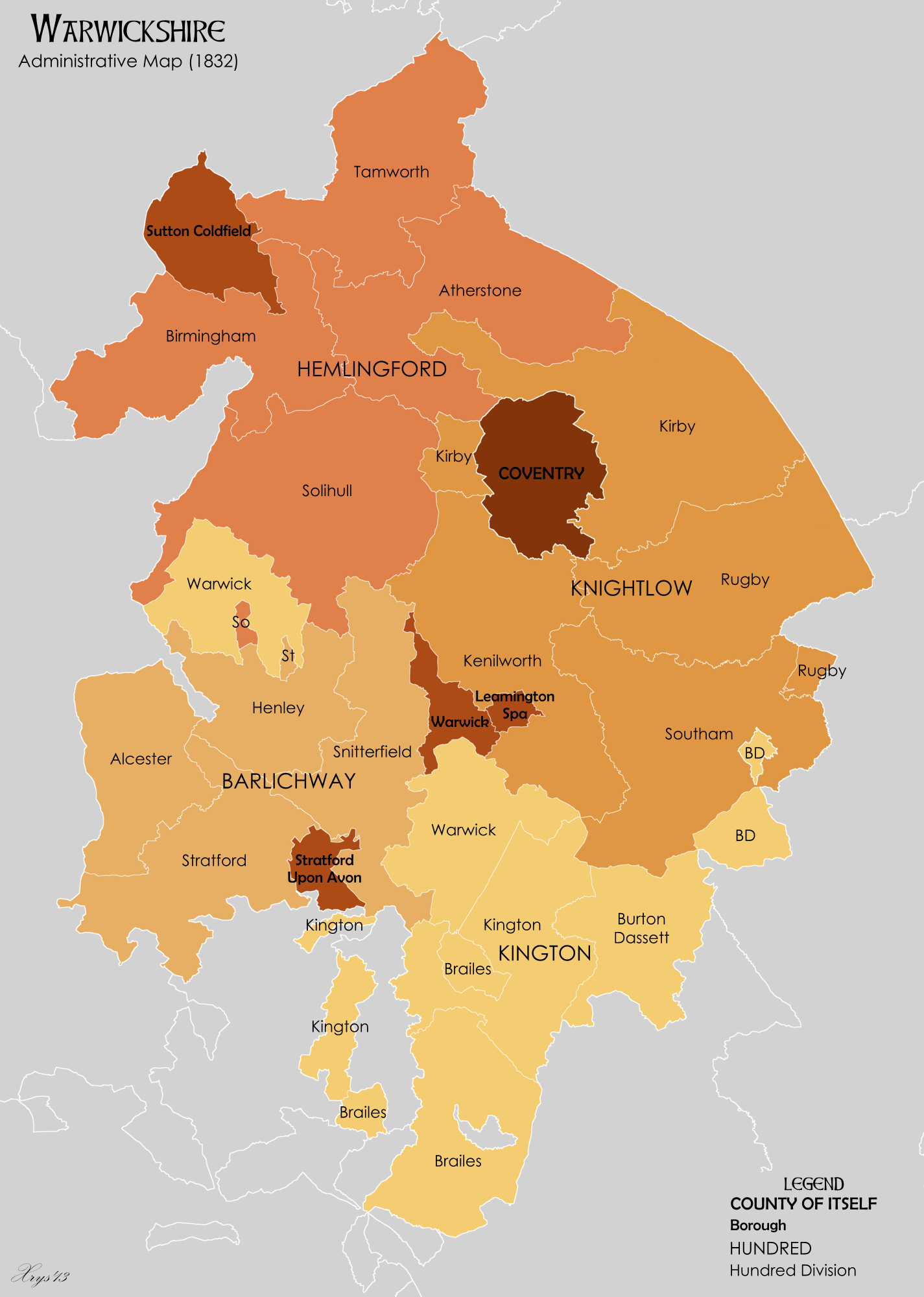
Warwickshire in 1832

It was one of four hundreds of Warwickshire, alongside Kington, Knightlow and Hemlingford.

The Hundred of Barlichway was formed in the 12th century from the earlier Hundreds of Fernecumbe and Patelau, together with the parishes of Tanworth, Packwood, and Lapworth which, until 1833, formed a detached part of Kington Hundred.
