= Little Packington =

Hamlet and civil parish in Warwickshire, England

Coordinates: 52°27′N 1°41′W

Little Packington is a hamlet and civil parish in the North Warwickshire district of the county of Warwickshire, England, and is sometimes known by the names Packington Piggott or Packington Parva. The hamlet is situated just to the northwest of Great Packington, close to the boundaries of Packington Park and sits on the River Blythe.

There is a small historic church dedicated to St Bartholomew at Little Packington. It is of Norman origin with medieval timber framing and features a chancel with a north vestry, nave with a west bell-cote, and a modern south porch. In the 17th-century internal additions were made. The living was united with Great Packington's on 1 August 1860 and the building has since been converted for use as a private dwelling, with access granted only on special request. It is now a Grade II listed building.

1½ miles northeast of the church is Hermitage Manor, dating from the 12th century; remnants of its buildings and moat still exist today. There is also an ancient sandstone footbridge, adjacent to a ford which crosses the River Blythe.

An "iconic" landfill site in the area closed in 2015.
