= Kington Hundred =

Former geographic division of Warwickshire, England

Kington or Kineton was a historic hundred of the county of Warwickshire in England. The hundred covered the southern part of the county, and lay south of Warwick, between the River Avon on the west and the River Itchen on the east. It was formed in the 12th century out of four Domesday hundreds, these were:

Tremelau, which contained the parishes of Atherstone-on-Stour, Barford, Butlers Marston, Chadshunt, Charlecote, Chesterton, Comberton, Compton Verney, Ettington, Gaydon, Halford, Lighthorne, Moreton Morrell, Newbold Pacey, the Pillertons, Tachbrook, and Wasperton.

Honesberie, containing Avon Dassett, Burton Dassett, Fenny Compton, Farnborough, part of Mollington, Priors Hardwick, Priors Marston, Radway, Ratley, Shotteswell, Warmington, and Wormleighton.

Fexhole, containing Brailes, Cherington, Compton Wynyates, Honington, Idlicote, Kineton, Lapworth, Oxhill, Packwood, Tanworth, Tysoe, Wellesbourne with Walton, and Whatcote.

Berricestone, or Barcheston, containing Barcheston, Barton-on-the Heath, Burmington, part of Ilmington, Long Compton, Stretton-on-Fosse, Whichford, Whitchurch, and Wolford.

None of these four Domesday hundreds occurs again outside the Survey, and by 1169 the 'sipesocha', or hundred, of Kington had taken their place. The hundred is said to have been granted by Henry II to Walter son of Thurstan de Charlecote, the ancestor of the Lucy family, to hold by a rent of 40s. During the reign of John it was taken into the king's hands and farmed at 21 marks, in addition to which the issues of the court leet produced 61s. 4d., sheriff's aid £10, and 'wardpeni' 8s. 8d. In 1227 Henry III inspected charters of Henry II and John confirming the hundred to William de Lucy and ordered that it should be restored to him. It had, however, come back to the Crown by 1236, when its farm was accounted for by William de Lucy as sheriff. From this time it was farmed out to various persons: as in 1270 Richard de Hersey, who paid 100 s. more than the old rent, Thomas Blaunkfront in 1317, John de Waltham in 1331, Geoffrey Oede in 1335, and Richard, Earl of Arundel, in 1356. A valuation of the issues of the hundred in 1367 shows that it was farmed at £8; the payments de certo of the vills amounted to £7 19s. 8d.; and those for 'warth' to 6s. 5d.

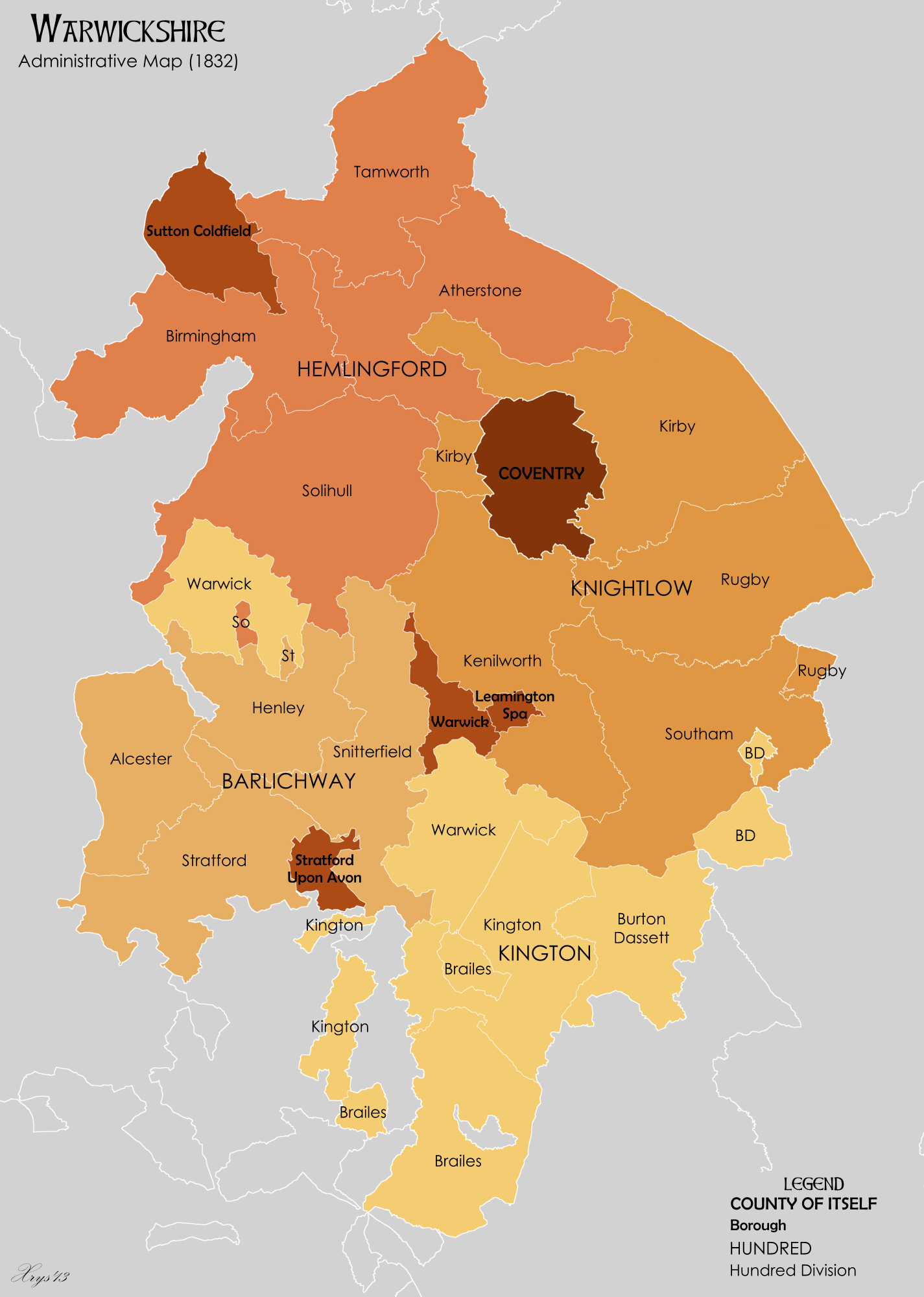
Warwickshire in 1832

By the time of Dugdale (c. 1645) the only vills doing suit to the hundred court were Shotteswell, Warmington, Stretton-on-Fosse, part of Wellesbourne, Oxhill, Avon Dassett, Mollington, Halford, Barton-on-the-Heath, Ratley, Farnborough, and Aylston. At this time the hundred was divided into the constabularies of Brailes, Kineton, Priors Marston, and Tanworth, each under a High Constable; these were replaced in 1828 by the Petty Sessional divisions of Kineton, Long Compton, Mollington and Warwick. In the present century the four divisions have become Brailes, Kineton, Burton Dassett and Warwick.

In 1844 the parish of Sutton-under-Brailes, which up to that time had been an isolated part of Gloucestershire entirely surrounded by Warwickshire, was transferred to this county.
