= Edge Hill, Warwickshire =

Escarpment, hamlet and battle site in England

Coordinates: 52.108°N 1.475°W

Edge Hill
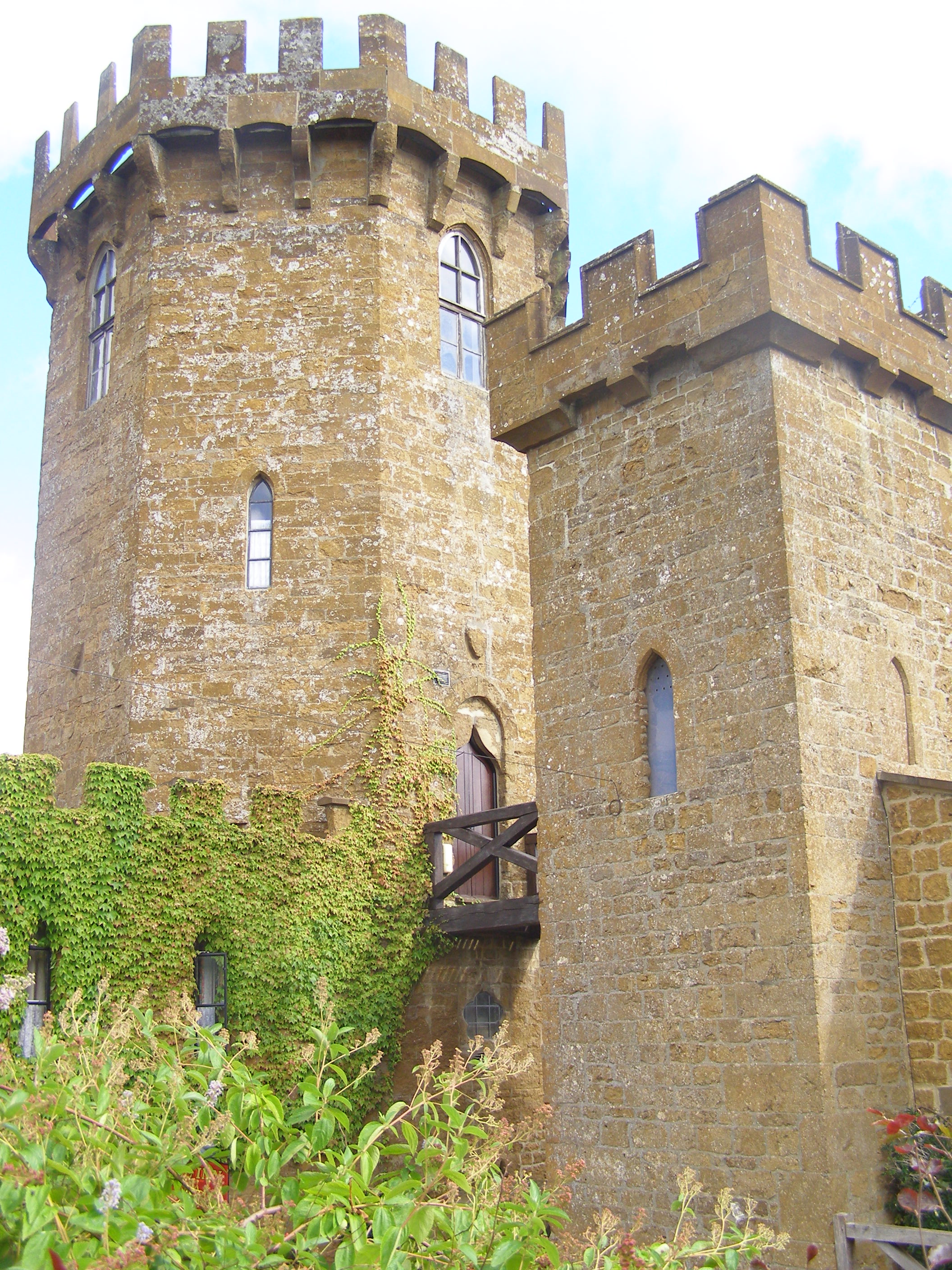
- Castle Inn, the Octagonal Tower

- Location within Warwickshire
- Interactive map of Edge Hill
- OS grid reference: SP370470
- Civil parish: Ratley and Upton
- District: Stratford-on-Avon
- Shire county: Warwickshire
- Region: West Midlands
- Country: England
- Sovereign state: United Kingdom
- Post town: Banbury
- Postcode district: OX15
- Dialling code: 01295
- Police: Warwickshire
- Fire: Warwickshire
- Ambulance: West Midlands

Edge Hill is an escarpment and Edgehill is a hamlet in the civil parish of Ratley and Upton, Stratford-on-Avon District, southern Warwickshire, England. At Ratley, the escarpment rises to 219 m (719 ft) above sea level and 112 m (367 ft) above nearby Radway, within 300 metres of the Warwickshire border with Oxfordshire.

Edge Hill gave its name to the first battle of the English Civil War, in which it was a prominent feature.

The hamlet has a public house, an eccentric building of local Hornton Stone called the Castle Inn that was built in the 1740s to the designs of Sanderson Miller (1716–80). It is controlled by the Hook Norton Brewery.

== Battle ==
The narrow wood on the scarp of Edge Hill, in the south-east overlooks the lower slope and the plain on which the battle was fought.

The battle of Edge Hill was fought on Sunday 23 October 1642 and was the first major battle in the English Civil War between the Royalist forces of King Charles I and the Parliamentarian army commanded by the Earl of Essex.

The King's army started the day on the plateau above the scarp and Parliament's front line was about 2,200 yards (2,000 m) away. From Edge Hill, the ground drops steeply, levels out, then rises to Battleton Holt and a little beyond it are the Oaks and Graveground Copice. It was across the latter two that Parliament's army was drawn up (grid reference SP346485 to SP367498). The King's forces descended from the escarpment and faced them, extended between the end of the spur at Knowle End and Brixfield Farm (SP349472 to SP376491). The King's army had to descend from the edge of the escarpment if they wished to engage the Parliamentarians in battle, because the escarpment was far too steep for Essex to consider an attack against the Royalist army while it was on the edge. At the time of the battle, there were far fewer trees. The battle was inconclusive, with both sides claiming victory. It would take several more years and many more battles before the Parliamentarians won the war.

In 1643, following reports of ghostly sightings published by a printer Thomas Jackson, the King sent a Royal commission to visit the site, where they claimed to have seen two phantom armies fighting in the sky above them.

== Quarrying ==
The area around Edge Hill has been quarried extensively for Jurassic ironstone since the 11th century. Later iron ore was quarried and transported on the Edge Hill Light Railway to the Stratford-upon-Avon and Midland Junction Railway near Burton Dassett.

== Sources ==
- Pevsner, Nikolaus; Wedgwood, Alexandra (1966). Warwickshire. The Buildings of England. Harmondsworth: Penguin Books. p. 380.
