= John of Mettingham =

English judge

John of Mettingham (died 1301) was an English judge. He served as a law clerk for Gilbert of Preston starting in 1265. After Preston's death Mettingham was appointed as a justice for the newly formed Assize Court in 1274. In 1278 a pair of permanent Eyre circuits were formed, and Preston was assigned to the northern one, sitting as a junior justice on every eyre on that circuit until 1288 and as Chief Justice for the Dorset sitting in 1288. Mettingham seems to have specialised in Quo warranto cases, but also heard ordinary civil litigation cases in at least five Counties. In 1290 he was made Chief Justice of the Common Pleas, a position he held until his death.

Legal offices
Preceded by Sir Ralph Sandwich	Chief Justice of the Common Pleas; 1290–1301	Succeeded by Ralph de Hengham
