= Knightlow Hundred =

Historical division of Warwickshire, England

Coordinates: 52.35°N 1.40°W

Knightlow Hundred was a hundred of the county of Warwickshire in England, formed in the 12th century out of the Domesday hundreds of Bomelau (Bumbelowe), Stanlei, and Meretone. It covered the eastern part of the county, including Coventry, Bedworth, Rugby, and Leamington.

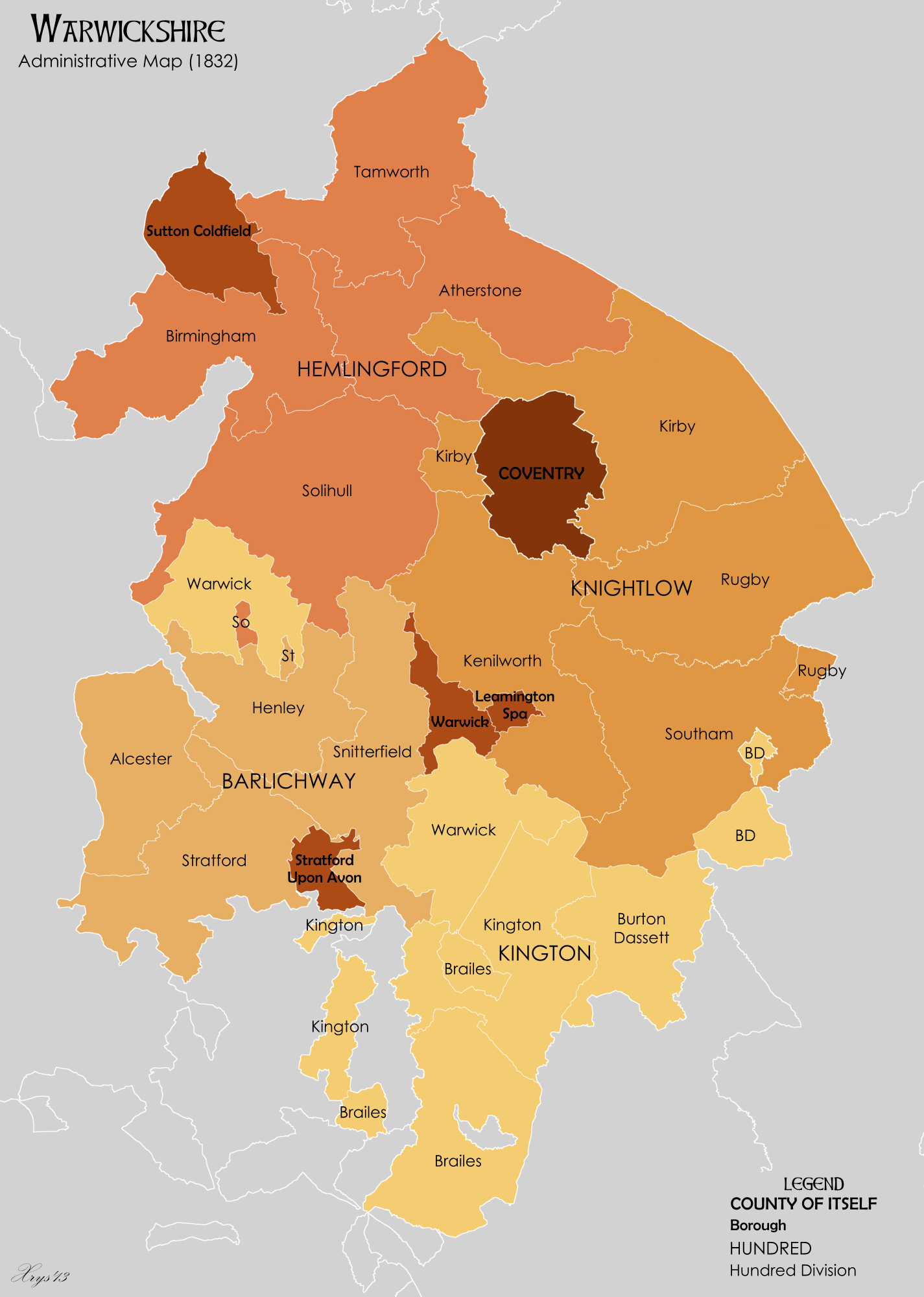
Warwickshire in 1832

It was one of four hundreds of Warwickshire, alongside Barlichway, Kington and Hemlingford.

It contained four subdivisions, those of Kenilworth, Kirby, Rugby and Southam.
