= George Baldwin Augustus =

American judge and politician

George Baldwin Augustus (1802 - September 20, 1850) was a judge and state legislator in Mississippi. He served in the Mississippi House of Representatives and Mississippi Senate. He represented Noxubee County in the Mississippi House of Representatives in 1836. He served as President of the Mississippi Senate from 1840 to 1842.

He served four terms in the Mississippi Senate. William Baldwin Augustus (1840–1901) was his son. Anne H. Augustus was his granddaughter.

He died September 20, 1850.
