= William Bereford =

English justice

Sir William Bereford (died 1326) was an English justice.

== Life ==
He was the son of Walter de Bereford, with the family name coming from the village of Barford, Warwickshire. In 1287 his brother, Osbert de Bereford, a previous High Sheriff of Warwickshire and Leicestershire, bought a property in Wishaw, and after his death a few years later the land was left to William. In the 1280s he also married Margaret, daughter of Hugh de Plessy, who brought lands in Wittenham, Berkshire, with whom he had at least one child, Edmund Bereford, who later became a King's Clerk.

By 1285, he was a Pleader for the Court of Common Pleas, and after the purging of the courts in 1289 and 1290 various avenues of promotion opened him, and he was made a justice of the Common Bench in 1292. In Michaelmas term of that year he joined one of the last countrywide Eyres. In 1294 he returned to the Common Bench, standing as second to John of Mettingham and then Ralph de Hengham before becoming Chief Justice in 1309 following Hengham's retirement. He was knighted in 1302, and in 1304 was appointed as a commissioner to investigate a break-in at the Treasury. In 1305 he was one of twenty-one representatives of the crown who met with an equal number of Scottish representatives to establish how to promote stability in Scotland, and in 1306 he was a commissioner of a Trailbaston on the northern circuit. After Edward II became king in 1307 he was in charge of collecting querelae, or formal complaints, against Walter Langton, who had been Edward I's treasurer and central advisor.

Bereford was associated with Piers Gaveston, a favorite of Edward II, perhaps because he had bought land in the Honour of Wallingford held by the earl. Bereford was one of only four who stood with the king against the barons who demanded Gaveston's exile in 1308, and acted as the executor of his will. Standing against the barons seems not to have harmed his career; in 1318 after attempts to reform the king's household he was among the ministers retained in office, where he stayed until his death in 1326.

== Notes ==
Legal offices
Preceded by Ralph de Hengham	Chief Justice of the Common Pleas; 1309–1326	Succeeded by Hervey de Stanton
