= Ralph de Hengham =

Medieval English cleric and justice in the 13th century

Sir Ralph de Hengham
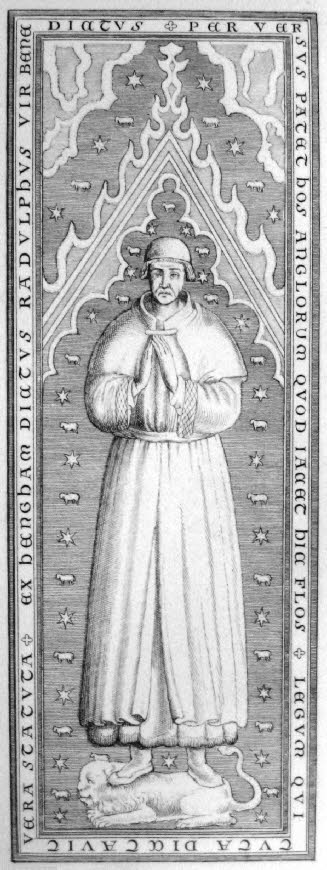
- A 17th-century engraving by Wenceslaus Hollar of Ralph de Hengham's monumental brass (no longer extant) at St Paul's Cathedral, London

12th Lord Chief Justice of England
- In office 1274–1290
- Monarch: Edward I
- Chancellor: Walter de Merton; Robert Burnell
- Preceded by: Martin of Littlebury
- Succeeded by: Gilbert de Thornton

18th Chief Justice of the Common Pleas
- In office 1301–1309
- Monarchs: Edward I Edward II
- Chancellor: John Langton; William Greenfield; William Hamilton; Ralph Baldock
- Preceded by: John of Mettingham
- Succeeded by: Sir William Bereford

Personal details
- Born: 1235
- Died: 18 May 1311 (aged 75–76)
- Resting place: Old St Paul's Cathedral, London; 51°30′49″N 0°5′54″W

Sir Ralph de Hengham (1235 – 18 May 1311) was an English cleric who held various high positions within the medieval English judicial system.

== Biography ==
=== Career ===
His first employer was Giles of Erdington a justice of the Common Bench, whose service he entered as a clerk before 1255. By 1260 he had become a clerk for the King's Bench, and later passed into the service of Richard of Middleton, with whom he served on the Eyre circuit of Martin of Littlebury in 1262, and on the circuit led by Middleton himself in 1268–1269. In July 1269 Middleton became the Lord Chancellor, an event which, along with Hengham's own abilities, helped in his rapid rise. He was appointed as a junior justice to the Eyre circuit led by Roger of Seaton in 1271 while only in his mid-thirties, and in 1272 became senior justice to an Eyre circuit of his own. After the death of Henry III brought all Eyre circuits to a halt Hengham was appointed to a central court as a junior justice of the Common Bench starting in Hilary term 1273.

For the following year and a half Hengham also served as an assize judge with Walter de Heliun in the West Midlands. He left the Common Bench in 1274 after being promoted to Chief Justice of the King's Bench, a position he held until 1290. Hengham was one of the many justices dismissed and disgraced between 1289 and 1290, with his dismissal coming in Hilary term 1290 due to misconduct in only a single case, and there on what appears to be a technicality. He was forced to pay 10,000 Marks over the next five years for his release from prison and pardon, far more than any of the other disgraced justices. The fine was not a reflection on his crimes or his high standing, but rather on his ability to pay; Hengham is known to have held three Cathedral canonries at Hereford, Lichfield and St Paul's, as well as prebends in five collegiate churches and livings in ten counties. He received annual pensions from seven religious corporations, and had land holdings in Cambridgeshire, Essex, Kent, and Warwickshire. There is a story that the money went to pay for a London clock tower, which eventually became Big Ben, but there is no contemporary evidence for this.

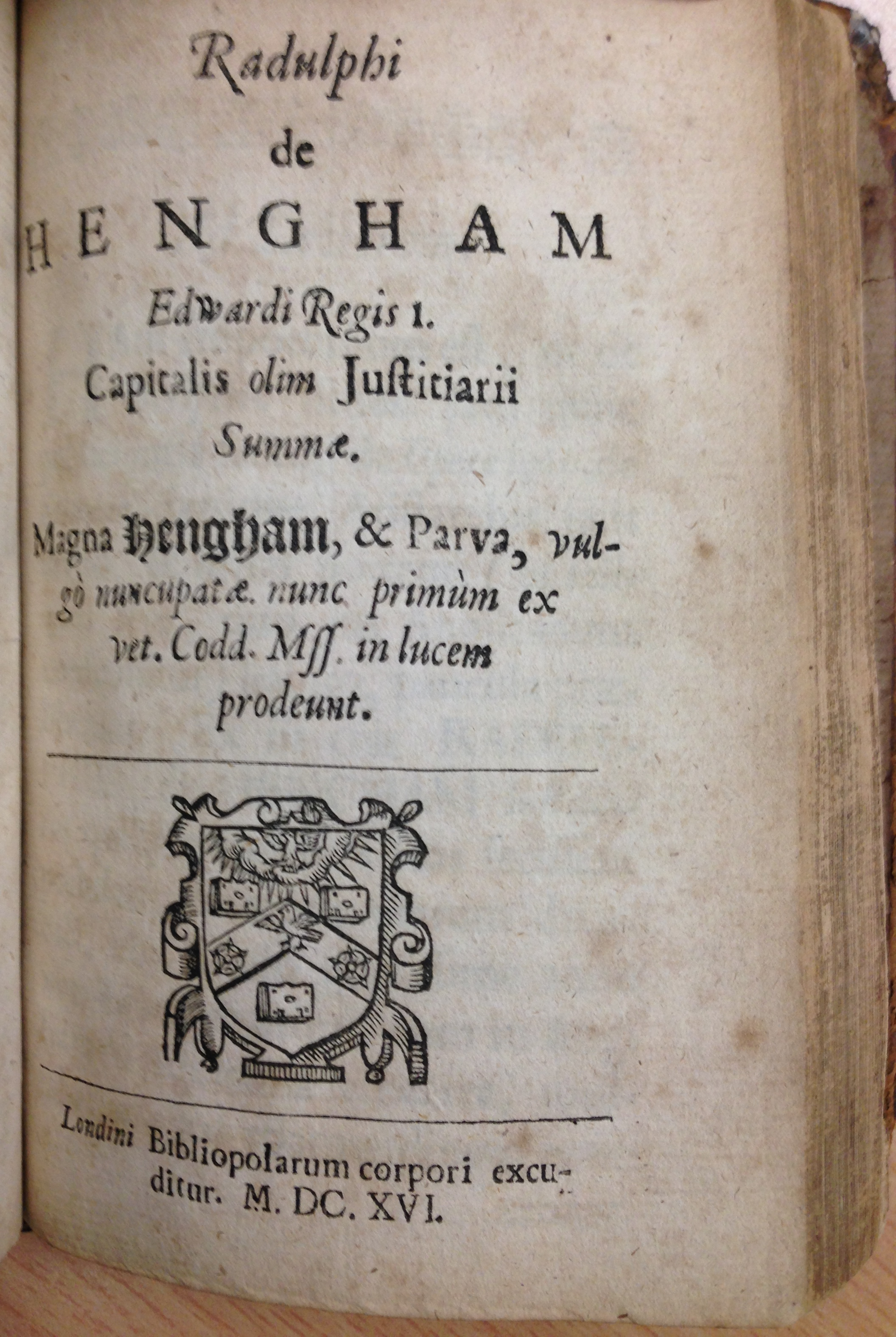
The title page of Hengham's collected works dated 1616, in John Fortescue's De Laudibus Legum Angliæ (In Praise of the Law of England, 2nd edition, 1660)

=== Later life ===
He regained the King's favour in the late 1290s, and was appointed as an Assize judge in September 1300 by Antony Bek, rejoining the King's council by the end of that year. After the death of John of Mettingham in 1301, Hengham was selected to replace him and was appointed Chief Justice of the Common Pleas, with records showing he was absent from the position only once (in 1302). He was reappointed in 1307 by Edward II but was replaced by Sir William Bereford in 1309. Hengham was the first Chief Justice known to take time at the end of the case to explain the point of law involved to students and apprentices who were observing, and is also credited as the author of Hengham parva (Small Hengham), a collection of lectures he had given for junior law students, and a later and unfinished work Hengham magna (Great Hengham), although this is unlikely as it differs from his earlier work in many stylistic ways. He was also most likely the author of two other consultations, one on quo warranto law written for the justices of the Northamptonshire Eyre in 1285 and a second written some time after this in response to a question from justices serving in Ireland. He lived for about two years after his retirement from the Common Bench, dying on 18 May 1311, and was buried in the quire at Old St Paul's Cathedral.

Legal offices
Preceded by Martin of Littlebury	Lord Chief Justice; 1274–1290	Succeeded by Gilbert de Thornton
Preceded by John of Mettingham	Chief Justice of the Common Pleas; 1301–1309	Succeeded by Sir William Bereford
