= Radway =

Village in Warwickshire, England

Coordinates: 52.130°N 1.464°W

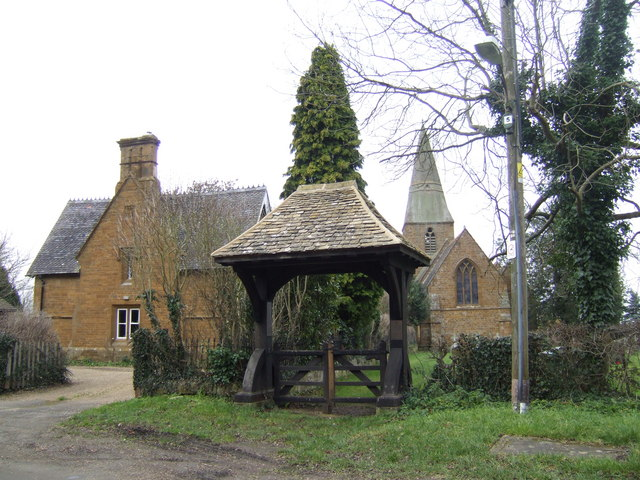
- St Peter's parish church and Lychgate

- Location within Warwickshire
- Population: 259 (2001 census)
- OS grid reference: SP3748
- Civil parish: Radway
- District: Stratford-on-Avon
- Shire county: Warwickshire
- Region: West Midlands
- Country: England
- Sovereign state: United Kingdom
- Post town: Warwick
- Postcode district: CV35
- Dialling code: 01295
- Police: Warwickshire
- Fire: Warwickshire
- Ambulance: West Midlands
- UK Parliament: Kenilworth and Southam

Radway is a village and civil parish in Warwickshire, England, about 7 miles (11 km) north-west of Banbury in neighbouring Oxfordshire. The population taken at the 2011 census had reduced to 238. The village is at the foot of Edge Hill and is notable for the Battle of Edgehill, one of the early major engagements of the English Civil War, which was fought in fields around the village.

== History ==
The earliest known record of Radway is in the Domesday Book of 1086. In medieval times its lands were divided between Arbury Priory and Stoneleigh Abbey.

After the Dissolution of the Monasteries under Henry VIII in the 1530s the lands of Radway were granted to various of Henry's circle, notably the Coke family. As the lands were sold over the following years, the manorialism system of Radway broke down.

The Battle of Edgehill, one of the early major engagements of the English Civil War, was fought in fields around the village and in the adjoining parishes of Ratley and Kineton.

Radway became a centre of Puritanism during and after the Commonwealth period. Persecution of Radway's Quakers and the jailing of some led eventually to a small group emigrating in the 1680s to a Quaker colony in Gloucester County, West New Jersey. Letters from New Jersey still survive in the local record office. Radway was enclosed in the 1750s, and was the home village of Sir Steven Runciman at the end of his life.

Radway has a cricket club.

== Architecture ==
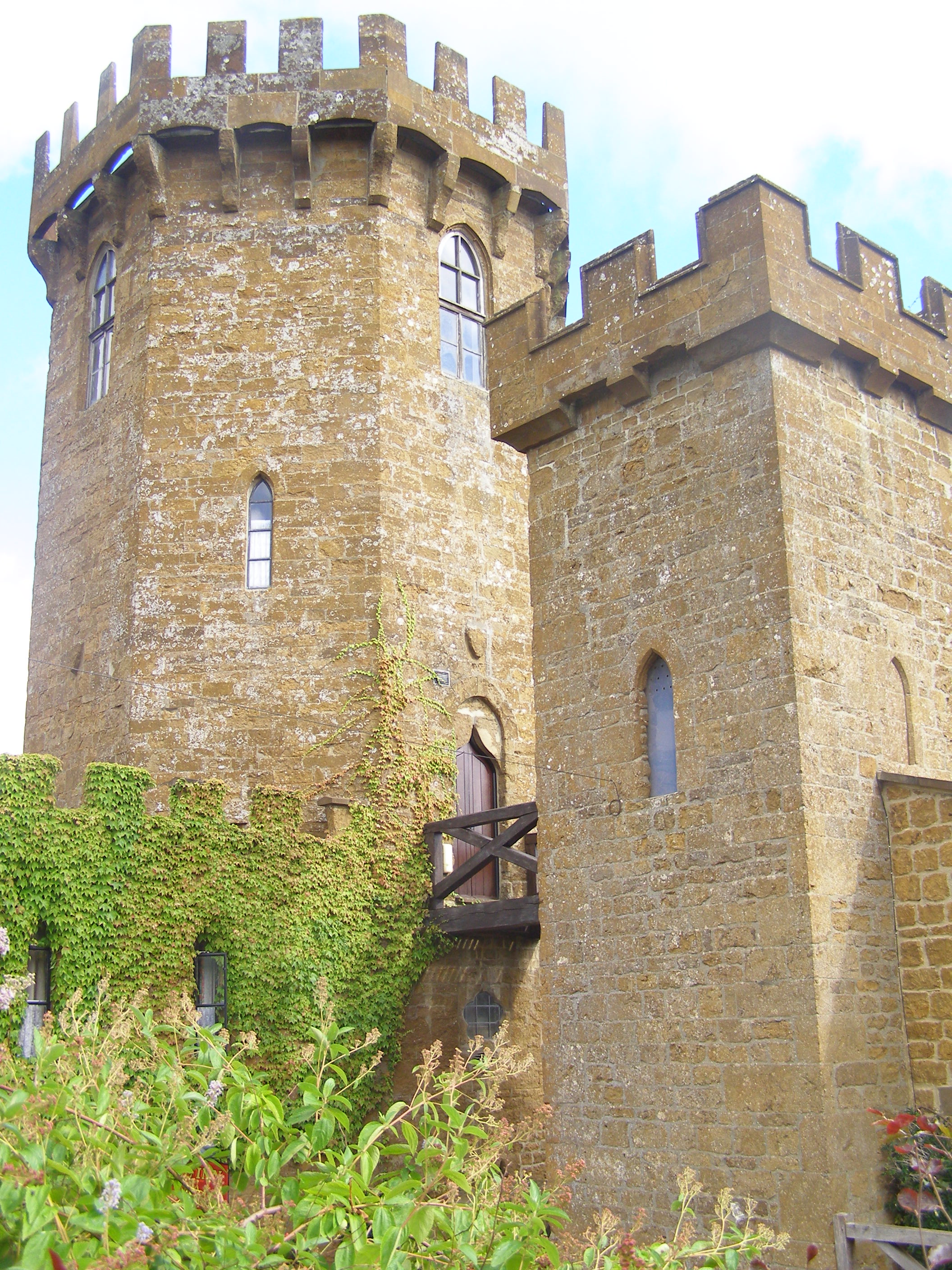
The Octagonal Tower

The Grange, originally an Elizabethan gentleman's house, was extensively re-modelled by Sanderson Miller in Gothic Revival style. It stands below the site of the original Stoneleigh Abbey grange and is still a private house. It was occupied by Douglas Haig before he became Commander in Chief on the Western Front in the First World War. The Grange is now owned by David Richards, former chairman of Aston Martin.

At the top of the ridge adjoining the hamlet of Edgehill is the Octagonal Tower, a folly designed by Sanderson Miller as a scale model of a tower at Warwick Castle. The folly has been a pub since it was built, named in 1817 as the Inniskilling Dragoon, but now the Castle Inn. It is said to stand on the site of another grange complex, known as Ratley Grange, also held by Stoneleigh Abbey. However, according to Miller's own diaries the Tower stood opposite Ratley Grange.

The Church of England parish church of Saint Peter was designed by the Gothic Revival architect Charles Buckeridge and built in 1866. The remains of a previous church, dating from the Middle Ages, are still visible. Inside St Peter's are memorials re-set from the previous church. They include the 15th-century effigy of a priest, the effigy of Captain Henry Kingsmill who fought for Charles I and died in the Battle of Edgehill, and the architect Sanderson Miller who died at Radway. St Peter's has a ring of five bells, all cast by Robert Stainbank of the Whitechapel Bell Foundry in 1868. In 2015 a Heritage Lottery Funded permanent exhibition 'The People's Struggle' about the adjacent Battle of Edgehill battlefield and the battle's impact upon the local community, opened within the Church. Two duplicate free-standing wind-up visitor audio guides were also installed within the village.

== Sources ==
- Brook, William (2010). A History of Radway. ISBN 978-1-4461-9329-7.
- Page, W.H., ed. (1908). A History of the County of Warwick, Volume 1. Victoria County History. pp. not stated.
- Pevsner, Nikolaus; Wedgwood, Alexandra (1966). Warwickshire. The Buildings of England. Harmondsworth: Penguin Books. pp. 379–380.
- Salzman, L.F., ed. (1949). A History of the County of Warwick, Volume 5: Kington Hundred. Victoria County History. pp. 142–144.
