= Ratley =

Village in Warwickshire, England

Coordinates: 52.12360°N 1.44345°W

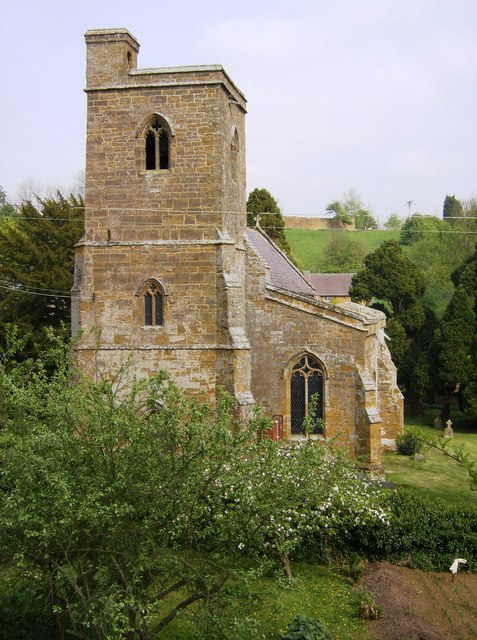
St. Peter ad Vincula parish church

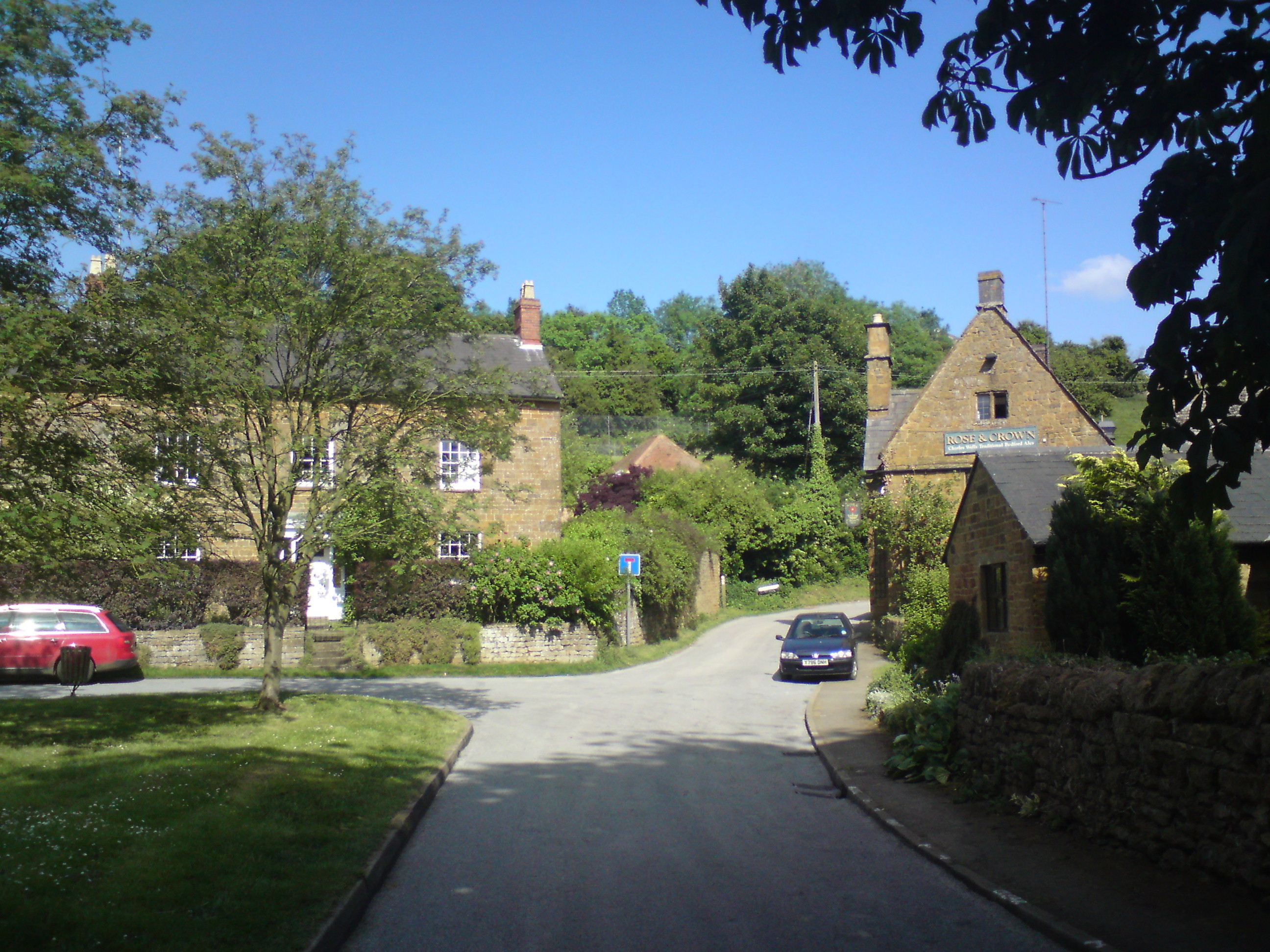
Part of the village in 2009

Ratley is a village in the civil parish of Ratley and Upton, Stratford-on-Avon District, Warwickshire, England. The population of the civil parish in 2011 was 327. It is on the northwest side of the Edge Hill escarpment about 200 metres (660 ft) above sea level. The village is close to the county border with north Oxfordshire, some 7 miles northwest of Banbury, the closest town.

== History of Ratley ==
The remains of a 12th-century motte and bailey castle are just outside the village, which were designated a Scheduled monument in 1961.

The Church of England parish church is Decorated Gothic and almost all of it was built in the 14th century. It is one of a few churches in England dedicated to St. Peter ad Vincula and is designated a Grade II* listed building.

The Battle of Edge Hill, the first battle of the English Civil War, was fought very near the village. The former Church of England school and local Post Office buildings are still standing but have been converted into houses.

Upton House is less than 1 mile (1.6 km) from the village. It houses a fine art collection and is managed by the National Trust.

In 1922 the Edge Hill Light Railway was built through the village to carry ironstone from a local quarry. It became disused after a few years and was dismantled in 1946.

== Amenities ==
The village has a public house, the Rose & Crown. Parts of the pub are reputed to be 900 years old. It is also a Grade I listed building. The village has a village hall and a sports pitch with football goals and children's play equipment, both of which can be used by the public.

== Sources ==
- Pevsner, Nikolaus; Wedgwood, Alexandra (1966). Warwickshire. The Buildings of England. Harmondsworth: Penguin Books. p. 382.
- Salzman, L.F., ed. (1949). A History of the County of Warwick, Volume 5: Kington Hundred. Victoria County History. pp. 144–147.
