= Fee tail =

Form of trust in English common law

Fee tail or entail is a legal concept and set of associated rules restricting the manner in which real property (especially land) passes from one generation to the next; these rules tend to keep deceased estates together as a whole, and in the hands of a single owner (heir), rather than allowing them to be split up amongst multiple children (as would tend to happen in similar situations in Continental European law). Entail has been known in English law since feudal times, and it has evolved as the law has evolved. It is concerned with heirship, ensuring the male line and preserving intergenerationally its power and ownership of property. As Lawrence Stone has argued, a key element is psychological: a strong attachment by those involved to the principle of preferential male primogeniture.

Two main phases may be identified:

- the "feudal" form, which was first attempted to be curbed by the Statute of Westminster 1285 and in which the entail could be barred (in England but not in Scotland) from the fifteenth century onwards by common recovery;
- the modern form, based on evolving trust law from the seventeenth century onwards. This used strict settlement and was brought to an end by the Settled Lands Acts 1882 to 1890.

== Modern form ==
In English common law, fee tail or entail is a form of trust, created by a deed or settlement by a 'grantor', that restricts the sale or inheritance of an estate in real property and prevents that property from being sold, wasted, devised by will, or otherwise alienated by a 'tenant-in-possession', and instead causes it to pass automatically and entirely, by operation of law, to an heir, or 'tenant in tail', as determined by the settlement deed.

The terms fee tail and tailzie are from Medieval Latin feodum talliatum, which means "cut(-short) fee". In its original form, the 'tenant in possession' is also a 'tenant for life' and has exclusive control over all fruits of the property while they live, but no prospect of coming into ownership of the property in 'fee simple'; the 'tenant in tail' can look forward to enjoying the property in 'fee simple' when the tenant in possession dies, but in the meanwhile has no access to the fruits of the property, except as specified in the 'settlement'.

Fee tail deeds are in contrast to "fee simple" deeds, possessors of which have an unrestricted title to the property, and are empowered to bequeath or dispose of it as they wish (although it may be subject to the allodial title of a monarch or of a governing body with the power of eminent domain). Equivalent legal concepts exist or formerly existed in many other European countries and elsewhere; in Scots law tailzie was codified in the Entail Act 1685.

Most common law jurisdictions have abolished fee tails or greatly restricted their use. They survive in limited form in England and Wales, but have been abolished in Scotland, Ireland, and all but four states of the United States.

== Purpose ==
The fee tail was devised to enable a patriarch to perpetuate his blood-line, family-name, honour and armorials in the persons of a series of capable and independent male descendants. By keeping his estate intact in the hands of one heir alone, in an ideally indefinite and pre-ordained chain of succession, his own wealth, power and family honour would not be dissipated amongst several male lines, as became the case for example in Napoleonic France by operation of the Napoleonic Code which gave each child the legal right to inherit an equal share of the patrimony, where a formerly great landowning family could be reduced in a few generations to a series of small-holders or peasant farmers. It approaches the true corporation, who is a legal person who does not die but continues to exist independently of the directors and owners.

Indeed, as a trust, whilst trustees may die, replacements are appointed. The trust itself continues, in perpetuity or not. As many jurisdictions do not allow perpetual entities in private interests, 'fees tail' are commonly restricted by a rule against perpetuities to extend only for a particular number of future generations.

An entail also had the effect of disallowing illegitimate children from inheriting.

Entails created complications for many propertied families, especially from about the late 17th to the early 19th century, leaving many individuals wealthy in land but heavily in debt, often due to annuities chargeable on the estate payable to the patriarch's widow and younger children, where the patriarch was swayed by sentiment not to establish a strict concentration of all his wealth in his lone heir while leaving his other beloved relatives destitute. Frequently in such cases the generosity of the settlor to people other than the heir left the entailed estate as an uneconomical enterprise, especially during times when the estate's fluctuating agricultural income had to provide for fixed sum annuities. Such tenants-in-possession were unable to sell (realise in cash) any part of their land—or even to offer the property as security for a loan—in order to pay such annuities. The workaround was to obtain permission for such sale from Parliament: by organising the passage of a private act of Parliament; this was an expensive, uncertain and time-consuming mechanism but it was frequently resorted to nevertheless. The beneficial owner (or tenant-in-possession) of the property in fact had only a life interest in it, albeit an absolute right to the income it generated, the legal owners being the trustees of the settlement, with the remainder passing intact to the next successor or heir in law; any purported bequest of the land or a portion of it by the tenant-in-possession was ineffective.

== History ==
Fee tail was established during feudal times by landed gentry to attempt to ensure that the high social standing of the family, as represented by a single patriarch, continued indefinitely. The concentration of the family's wealth into the hands of a single representative was essential to support this process. Unless the heir had himself inherited the personal and intellectual strengths of the original great patriarch, often a great warrior, which alone had brought him from obscurity to greatness, he would soon sink again into obscurity, and required wealth to maintain his social standing. This feature of English gentry and aristocracy differs from the aristocracy which existed in pre-Revolution France, where all sons of a nobleman inherited his title and were thus inescapably members of a separate noble caste in society. Little-known, France then had one of the lowest ratios of noble families to population, in Europe. The accepted rule was however largely compensated by written or notarized wills which allowed fathers to favour, within certain limits, a first-born son. In England, primogeniture provided that an estate would be inherited entirely by the first-born legitimate son of a nobleman and that, accordingly, subsequent sons were born as mere gentlemen and commoners. Without the support of wealth, these younger sons might quickly descend into obscurity, and often did. On this eldest son was concentrated the honour of the family, and to him alone was granted all its wealth to support his role in that regard, by the process of the fee tail.

The effects of English primogeniture and entail have been significant plot details or themes in a number of notable works of English literature. (See some examples cited below.)

=== Statute of Westminster 1285 ===
The Statute of Westminster II, passed in 1285, created and fixed the form of this estate. The new law was also formally called the statute De Donis Conditionalibus (Concerning Conditional Gifts).

=== Opponents ===
Fee tail was never popular with the monarchy, the merchant class and many holders of entailed estates themselves who wished to sell or divide their land.

=== Abolition ===
Fee tail as a legal estate in England was abolished by the Law of Property Act 1925. However, they continued to exist as equitable interests (see § Continuing use below).

=== Continuing use ===
No new fees tail can now be created following the Trusts of Land and Appointment of Trustees Act 1996.

A fee tail created before 1 January 1997 can still exist in England and Wales as an equitable interest, behind a strict settlement; the legal estate is vested in the current tenant for life or other person immediately entitled to the income, but on the basis that any capital money arising must be paid to the settlement trustees. A tenant in tail in possession can bar his fee tail by a simple disentailing deed, which does not now have to be enrolled. A tenant in tail in reversion (i.e., a future interest where the property is subject to prior life interest) needs the consent of the life tenant and any 'special protectors' to vest a reversionary fee simple in himself. Otherwise he can only create a base fee; a base fee only confers a right to the property on its owner, when its creator would have become entitled to it; if its creator dies before he would have received it, the owner of the base fee gets nothing.

In the U.S., conservation easements are a form of entail still in use.

== Creation ==
Traditionally, a fee tail was created by a trust established in a deed, often a marriage settlement, or in a will "to A and the heirs of his body". The crucial difference between the words of conveyance and the words that created a fee simple ("to A and his heirs") is that the heirs "in tail" must be the children begotten by the landowner. It was most commonly applied in limiting form of deed establishing a "fee tail male", by which only sons could inherit, although there might be an alternative limiting form of "fee tail female", by which only daughters could inherit; and "fee tail special", which had a further condition of inheritance, usually restricting succession to certain "heirs of the body" and excluding others. Land subject to these conditions was said to be "entailed" or "held in-tail", with the restrictions themselves known as entailments.

However, owing to the rule against perpetuities in the common law of England, the control established by a fee tail can be exercised over no more than two future generations — such that the terms of a will can create restrictions over the future disposal of real property by the testator's son and heir, but not over the further disposal of that property by that heir's own heirs. The reason in law is that such a third-generation disposal might feasibly fall further into the future than "a life in being plus twenty-one years"; and consequently terms in a will written to constrain that disposal would be void from the outset as extending into 'perpetuity'.

Nevertheless, landed families commonly sought to establish a means to exercise just such perpetual control over estates of real property disposed of to future generations. The means by this was achieved in England from the mid-17th to the mid-19th century was through each successive generation of 'tenants in tail', on coming of age, entering into a strict settlement that converted them into 'tenants for life'. In exchange for surrendering the potential for eventually possessing the family estate in fee simple—on the death of the current 'tenant in possession' (usually their father)—the heir to the estate chose rather themselves to become 'tenant for life' with a guaranteed income from the estate sufficient (if possible) to allow them to marry; such that the status of 'tenant in tail' now specified their own future son and heir. And should that son come to be born, and to reach legal majority, the process would repeat as 'resettlement'; each time with the legal persons in the entail chain jumping a generation. It would always be possible for an heir, as tenant in tail, to refuse to comply with this successive procedure; but without the support of their family, and specifically their father, they faced general disinheritance (other than the entailed estate) and a long wait before they would be able to access the entailed estate. Though with the consent of the current 'tenant in possession' the 'tenant in tail' could join in barring the entail through common recovery.

It was fundamental to the procedure of repeated 'resettlement', that although the person identified as 'tenant in tail' jumped down a generation each time it was done, the person identified as 'grantor'of the estate in fee tail remained as in the original entail. Consequently, should any 'tenant in possession' of an estate in fee tail male, fail to produce a male heir it might still be possible to find a male cousin (however remote) who could trace descent uninterrupted in the male line from the original grantor. The longer a single family had remained in possession of an estate, the more likely it was that an heir in the male line could somewhere be found. Whereas family estates of recent creation were more likely to fail altogether in the male line, and be broken up to female heirs or sold altogether. In finding a cousin to succeed in the indirect male line, it was common for the new entrant as 'tenant in tail' to be required to take (or resume) the ancient family name. Very commonly, when a younger son had married an heiress in another family, they would have dropped their birth surname and taken that of their wife's family. But if returning to their senior line as male heir, they would generally change their surname back; or join their surnames in hyphenated form. Over the centuries, almost all English families possessing estates in fee tail under a single name, nevertheless had at least one break in the line of male succession, glossed over through surname changes.

== Breaking of fee tail ==
The breaking of a fee tail was simplified by the Fines and Recoveries Act 1833, which allowed the holders of property in tail to file a disentailing assurance freeing them from its conditions; such a document needed to be enrolled. This obviated the previous method of breaking entails, the arcane legal fictions that enabled the system of common recovery.

The requirement that a disentailing assurance should be enrolled was abolished in 1926.

== Mortgage of entailed lands ==
Lending upon security of a mortgage on land in fee tail was risky, since at the death of the tenant-in-possession, his personal estate ceased to have any right to the estate or to the income it generated. The absolute right to the income generated by the estate passed by operation of law to parties who had no legal obligation to the lender, who therefore could not enforce payment of interest on the new tenants-in-possession. The largest estate a possessor in fee tail could convey to someone else was an estate for the term of the grantor's own life. If all went as planned, it was therefore impossible for the succession of patriarchs to lose the land, which was the idea.

== Failure of issue ==
Things did not always go as planned, however. Tenants-in-possession of entailed estates occasionally suffered "failure of issue" – that is, they had no legitimate children surviving them at the time of their deaths. In this situation the entailed land devolved to male cousins, i.e., back up and through the family tree to legitimate male descendants of former tenants-in-possession, or reverted to the last owner in fee simple, if still living. This situation produced complicated litigation and was an incentive for the production and maintenance of detailed and authoritative family pedigrees and supporting records of marriage, births, baptisms etc.

Depending on how the original deed or grant was worded, in the event of there being daughters but no sons, all the sisters might inherit jointly, it might pass to the eldest sister, it might be held in trust until one of them should produce a (legitimate) son, or it might pass to the next male-line relative (an uncle, say, or even a cousin, sometimes very distant). The last possibility, commonly called 'entailment to heirs male', is used in Jane Austen's Pride and Prejudice; the estate of Longbourn is entailed to a distant male cousin rather than the incumbent's five daughters or their offspring.

== Common recovery ==
In the 15th century, lawyers devised "common recovery", an elaborate legal procedure which used collaborative lawsuits and legal fictions to "bar" a fee tail, that is to say to remove the restrictions of fee tail from land and to enable its conveyance in fee simple. Biancalana's book The Fee Tail and the Common Recovery in Medieval England: 1176–1502 (2001) discusses the procedure and its history at length.

== Resettlement ==
In the 17th and 18th centuries the practice arose whereby when the son came of age (at 21), he and his father acting together could bar the existing fee tail, and could then re-settle the land in fee tail, again on the father for life, then to the son for life and his heirs male successively, but at the same time making provision for annuities chargeable on the estate for the father's widow, daughters and younger sons, and most importantly, and as an incentive for the son to participate in the re-settlement, an income for the son during his father's lifetime. This process effectively evaded the rule against perpetuities, as the entail in law had been terminated, but in practice continued. In this way an estate could stay in a family for many generations, yet emerged on re-settlement often fatally weakened, or much more susceptible to agricultural downturns, from the onerous annuities now chargeable on it.

== Formedon ==
Formedon (or form down etc.) was a right of writ exercisable by a holder in fee for claiming property entailed by a lessee beyond the terms of his feoffment. A letter dated 1539 from the Lisle Letters describes the circumstances of its use:

I received your ladyship's letter by which ye willed me to speak with my Lady Coffyn for her title in East Haggynton in the county of Devon who had one estate in tail to him and to his heirs of her body begotten; and now he is dead without issue of his body so that the reversion should revert to Mr John Basset and to his heirs so there be no let nor discontinuance of the same made by Sir William Coffyn in his life. Howbeit Mr Richard Coffyn, next heir to Sir William Coffyn, claimeth the same by his uncle's feoffment to him and to his heirs so that the law will put Mr John Basset from his entry and to compel him to take his action of form down which is much dilatory as Mr Basset knoweth

== Historical examples ==
=== Edward III ===
It was argued that Richard II of England, through his tyranny and misgovernment, had rendered himself unworthy of being king. According to the normal law of primogeniture, the heir to the throne at this point would have been Edmund Mortimer, Earl of March, great-grandson of Edward III's second son to reach adulthood, Lionel, Duke of Clarence, through Lionel's daughter Philippa. Bolingbroke's father, John of Gaunt, was Edward's next eldest son. However, in 1376 Edward had entailed the succession to heirs male, bypassing Philippa and her descendants in favour of his next eldest son, John of Gaunt, and thence his son Henry Bolingbroke, Henry IV of England.

=== Marquess of Hertford ===
An English example of a fee tail may be the main estates of the wealthy art collector Richard Seymour-Conway, 4th Marquess of Hertford (d. 1870). His only child was his illegitimate son, Sir Richard Wallace, 1st Baronet, to whom he left as much of his property as he could. The main land holdings and Ragley Hall were inherited by his distant cousin, Francis Seymour, 5th Marquess of Hertford, descended from a younger son of the 1st Marquess who had died in 1794. Most of the 4th Marquess's art collection had been acquired by himself or his father, went to Wallace, and is now the Wallace Collection. Other works were covered by the fee tail, however, and passed to the 5th Marquess.

=== Earl of Pembroke ===
Another example was George Herbert, 11th Earl of Pembroke, who died in 1827. He had quarrelled with his eldest son, later the 12th Earl, and left his unentailed estate to Sidney Herbert, 1st Baron Herbert of Lea, his son by a second marriage.

== Fees tail in fiction ==
Fees tail figure in the plots of several well known novels and stories, particularly in the 19th century, including:

- Pride and Prejudice (1813) by Jane Austen
- Guy Mannering (1815) by Walter Scott – inheritance of an estate goes to an heir of tailzie.
- Middlemarch (1871–1872) by George Eliot
- The Belton Estate (1866) and Ralph the Heir (1871) by Anthony Trollope
- Kidnapped (1886) and The Master of Ballantrae (1889) by Robert Louis Stevenson
- The Adventure of the Priory School by Arthur Conan Doyle
- Brideshead Revisited by Evelyn Waugh
- Wideacre by Philippa Gregory
- The Quincunx by Charles Palliser (written in 1989, but it takes the form of a Dickensian mystery set in early-19th-century England)
- Downton Abbey by Julian Fellowes (written in 2009–2015, but set in England in the period 1912–1927)
- To Kill a Mockingbird by Harper Lee (referred to as an "entailment")
- Wives and Daughters by Elizabeth Gaskell

=== Pride and Prejudice ===
Pride and Prejudice contains a particularly thorny example of the kind of problems which could arise through the entailing of property. Mr. Bennet, the father of protagonist Elizabeth Bennet, had only a life interest in the Longbourn estate, the family's home and principal source of income. He had no authority to dictate to whom it should pass upon his death, as it was strictly arranged to be inherited by the next male heir. Had Mr. Bennet fathered a son it would have passed to him, but it could not pass to any of his five daughters. Instead, the next nearest male heir would inherit the property—Mr. Bennet's cousin, William Collins, a boorish minister in his mid-twenties. The inheritance of the Longbourn property completely excluded the five Bennet daughters, who were thus to lose their home and income upon their father's death. The need for the daughters to make a good marriage to ensure their future security is a key motivation for many episodes in the novel. Many fees tail arose from wills, rather than from marriage settlements which usually made some provision for daughters. Austen was very familiar with the law of entail; her brother, Edward, had inherited similarly entailed estates at Chawton, Godmersham, and Winchester from distant cousins under the will of Elizabeth Knight, who died in 1737.

Law professor Maureen B. Collins (2017) cites several other authors debating the accuracy of Austen's depiction of the entailment, including Appel (2013), Treitel (1984), Redmond (1989), and Grover (2014).

== Other countries ==
=== Scotland ===
In Scots law, the word tailzie "comes from the French Word tailier, to cut", implying "cutting the ordinary Line of Succession, and giving the Estate to others than those to whom it would have descended by Law." By the late 18th century it was also known as entail, but the archaic spelling continued in law books. The Abolition of Feudal Tenure etc. (Scotland) Act 2000 (section 50) abolished all feudal tenures including entail. Today, the doctrines of legitim and jus relictae restrict owners from willing property out of their family when they die with children or have a surviving partner.

A Scottish example of entail is the case of Alfred Douglas-Hamilton, 13th Duke of Hamilton, who in 1895 inherited from the 12th Duke, his fourth cousin, who had attempted to marry his daughter to the heir.

=== Ireland ===
In the Republic of Ireland, section 13 of the Land and Conveyancing Law Reform Act 2009 largely abolished the fee tail and converted existing fees tail to fees simple. For constitutional reasons, this section is subject to a saving clause which prevents the conversion of fees tail to fees simple where the protector of the settlement is still alive. Therefore, some fees tail still exist in the state.

=== United States ===
The fee tail has been abolished in all but four states in the United States: Massachusetts, Maine, Delaware, and Rhode Island. However, in the first three states, property can be sold or deeded as any other property would be, with the fee tail only applying in case of death without a will. In Rhode Island, a fee tail is treated as a life estate with remainder in the life tenant's children. New York abolished fee tail in 1782, while many other states within the U.S. never recognized it at all. In most states in the United States, an attempt to create a fee tail results in a fee simple; even in those four states that still allow fee tail, the estate holder may convert his fee tail to a fee simple during his lifetime by executing a deed.

In Louisiana, the common law concept of estates in land never existed. The concept of forced heirship and the marital portion protects force heirs and surviving spouses from total divestment of value of the estate of the decedent, who has a duty to provide for their care.

Fee tail-like restrictions still exist though contractual obligations. For example, owners of inholdings inside public lands may be prevented from selling or giving their land to non-family members. In this case, the restrictions result from an agreement between the government and the land owner, and is not a part of a deed or settlement.

=== Polish–Lithuanian Commonwealth ===
In the Kingdom of Poland and later in the Polish–Lithuanian Commonwealth, fee tail estates were called ordynacja (Polish: [ɔrdɨˈnatsja]; landed property in fideicommis). Ordynacja was an economic institution for governing of landed property introduced in late 16th century by king Stefan Batory. Ordynacja was abolished by the agricultural reform in the People's Republic of Poland. Ordynat was the title of the principal heir of ordynacja.

According to the rules of ordynacja, which became a statute approved by the Sejm, the estate was not to be divided between the heirs but inherited in full by the eldest son (primogeniture). Women were excluded from inheritance (Salic law). Ordynacja could not be sold or mortgaged.

Ordynacja was similar to the French law of majorat or German and Scandinavian fideicommis, and succession to such resembles that of British peerages.

Many Polish magnates' fortunes were based on ordynacja, among them those of the Radziwiłłs, Zamoyskis, Czartoryskis, Potockis, Wielopolskis and Lubomirskis. Most important ordynacja were veritable little principalities. The earliest and most extensive ordynacje include:

- Ordynacje Radziwiłłów, created for Mikołaj VII Radziwiłł, Albrecht Radziwiłł and Stanisław Radziwiłł in 1589, centered on Olyka, Nesvizh, and Kletsk
- Ordynacja Ostrogska, created for Janusz Ostrogski in 1609, later inherited by the Zaslawski, Lubomirski and Sanguszko families, centered on Ostroh
- Ordynacja Zamojska, created for Jan Zamoyski in 1589, centered on Zamość
- Ordynacja Jarosławska, created for Rafał Jarosławski in 1470, centered on Jarosław
- Ordynacja Pińczowska, created for Piotr and Zygmunt Myszkowski in 1601, later inherited by the Wielopolski family, centered on Pińczów

=== Other ===
Other European legal systems had comparable devices to keep estates together, especially in Spain and Northern European countries like Prussia. They are derived from fideicommissum, a legal institution in Roman law. Unlike most of the English aristocracy, the Prussian Junkers supported fees tail, and succeeded in reinstating them in 1853, after they had been abolished in a recent Constitution. In Germany and Austria the Familienfideikommiss was only abolished in 1938, and in Scandinavia they persisted even later – a few old Swedish fees tail still remain in force, though no new ones may be established. For the law of German and Austrian fideicommissa in particular, an 862-page manual by the German legal scholar Philipp Knipschildt, entitled Tractatus de fideicommissis nobilium familiarum – von Stammgütern, was the standard reference work. First published in 1654, this grand systematization of existing legal opinion was frequently reprinted and continued to be consulted until well into the 19th century.

== See also ==
- Reichserbhofgesetz
- Rule in Wild's Case
- Taltarum's Case
- Easement
