= Taltarum's Case =

15th century English legal case

- Court: Court of Common Pleas
- Decided: Easter Term 1465 and Michaelmas Term 1472
- Citation: Y. B. 12 Edw. IV. 19-21

Court membership
- Judges sitting: Sir Richard Choke, Sir Thomas Bryan, Sir Thomas de Littleton, Richard Neele

Keywords
- entailed estates (fee tail); common recovery; barring the entail (conversion to normal estate of fee simple)

Taltarum's Case is the name given to an English legal case heard in the Court of Common Pleas, with decisions being handed down in 1465 and 1472. The case was long thought to have established the operation of the common recovery, a collusive legal procedure that was, until finally abolished in 1833, an important element of English law of real property. By means of a complex legal fiction, a recovery converted a freehold or copyhold property held in fee tail, which could not be freely sold or disposed of, into an estate in fee simple, which could be disposed without restriction.

Although the principles of the common recovery had existed before 1472, the extensive discussion of these principles by the judges in Taltarum's Case meant that in succeeding centuries the common recovery's procedures, and even the names of some of the fictitious individuals involved in them, were modelled on the case.

Although traditionally known as Taltarum's Case, this name was in fact a misspelling: it was originally entered in the Plea Rolls as "Talcarn's Case". The name of the individual referred to, one Thomas Talcarn of Godcote in Cornwall, was spelt Talcarn, Talcarum, or Talkarum, in the original documents, though never in the form "Taltarum" under which the case became famous. The case would be referred to as Hunt v Smyth if modern naming conventions were followed.

== Principle of barring the entail ==
Entails had been established by the Statute of Westminster 1285. The statute included a clause known by the title De donis conditionalibus ("concerning conditional gifts"), which enacted that in grants of land to a man and the heirs of his body, the will of the donor as expressed in the grant should be strictly followed. Prior to this time, judges had held that if an estate was granted to a man and the heirs of his body, and heirs were subsequently born, he had title to the land in fee simple and could do as he wished with it, including selling it, even if this was contrary to the original donor's intent. The effect of De donis, however, meant that if an estate was granted to a man and the heirs of his body, he could not dispose of it any other way; it had to pass to his heirs. Furthermore, if the heirs died out, the donor could claim the land back: this right was known as the "reversion". Such an estate was said to be in "fee tail", derived from the French tailler, to cut, as the inheritance was cut down and confined to the heirs of the body.

While the statute had originally been intended to strengthen the feudal system by preventing land passing out of a family's ownership, in the following centuries, landowners became increasingly frustrated with the restrictions imposed by entails. The common recovery, the outline of which had probably been established in the mid fourteenth century, was developed to circumvent these restrictions. Its underlying principle was that an entail could be broken if the issue (i.e. the persons who would otherwise have received the land under the entail) were compensated. The compensation was, however, a fictitious one, created only for the purpose of breaking the entail.The process worked as follows:

The owner (in tail) of the land, A, wished to convert it from fee tail to fee simple. Accordingly, he conveyed it to someone else B (known as the tenant in praecipe, usually a lawyer acting for the owner) to the intent that a third person C (known as the demandant, and usually an estate trustee or the purchaser, if the land was being sold) might sue for it. C accordingly issued a writ against B, saying he had been unjustly dispossessed of the land by a (fictitious) individual usually named as "Hugh Hunt".

In court, B defended his right saying (correctly) that he had acquired it from A. A (now called the vouchee) was called upon to vouch for his right to the land. He alleged that he had acquired it from D (a person known as the common vouchee, and whose part was usually played by the court crier). D asked for time and failed to appear subsequently; alternatively, he dashed out of the court. In either case, the judgment was that C should recover the land, and that D should compensate B with land of equal value. However, D was chosen because he was a man of straw with no property at all, so that the judgment against him was valueless, and it was never enforced. The result was thus that C recovered the land in fee simple, which A had owned in only fee tail. Being held in fee simple, the land could now be freely sold or transferred or a new settlement made, thus defeating De donis conditionalibus.

The exact principle by which the entail was barred was merely inferred from the judges' reasoning in Taltarum's Case, rather than being an explicit part of their judgment. The four judges had been considering what effect a recovery would have when multiple entails existed: would it bar all entails, or only that of which the defendant was seised at the time? The conclusion they drew was that it would only bar the entail under which the defendant was then in possession. Based on this reasoning, lawyers had developed the device of the "double voucher": if the owner in tail conveyed the land to someone else, the "tenant in praecipe", at the start of the procedure, and the demandant then sued the tenant in praecipe rather than simply suing the owner directly, the recovery would not only bar the land passing to the owner's heirs, it would also extinguish any other entails, in addition to the claim of the original donor in the event the heirs died out. Solomon Atkinson, in The Theory and Practice of Conveyancing (1839), stated the facts (as then understood) thus:

in the reign of Ed. 4 [...] the judges [...] determined, that even a nominal and fictitious recompense, descending to the issue in tail, should be an effectual bar, not only to the issue in tail, but also to the persons entitled in remainder and reversion. This, though not expressly so decided, is the inference drawn from the determination of the judges in the celebrated case 12 Ed. 4, known as Taltarum's case.

== History of the case ==
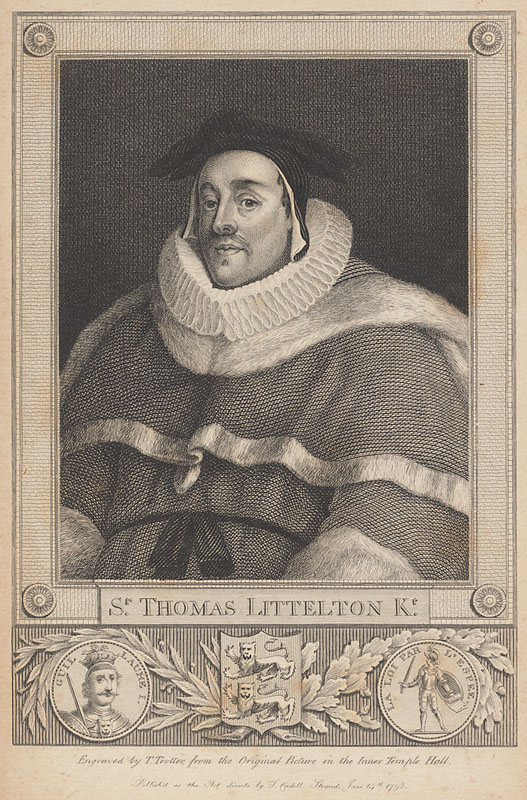
Thomas Littleton, J.C.P., was one of the four judges in Taltarum's Case, which took place at the time he was writing his Treatise on Tenures

Legal authorities' comments on Taltarum's Case had been based on two slightly contradictory reports written in the Year Book, rather than on the original records. The true history of the case was eventually researched by Frederic William Maitland, who located it on the De Banco Roll for Mich. 12 Edward IV, m.631 (1472). He noted that it concerned a messuage and 100 acres of land in Portreath, Cornwall. Maitland continued:

The plaintiff was Henry Hunt; the defendant was John Smyth. The action was on the statute of 5 Richard II against forcible entry, and the plaintiff sued "tam pro domine Rege quam pro seipso". The original feoffor mentioned in the defendant's plea was Thomas Trevistarum. In the plaintiff's replication the famous recovery is alleged to have taken place in the Easter term of 5 Edward IV, before Robert Danby and his fellow justices of the bench. The writ stated that John Arundel, the lord of the fee, had remised his court. The demandant in it was Thomas Talkarum or Talcarum. His name is written many times, now with a k, now with a c, never with a t. The vouchee was Robert Kyng. The well-known rejoinder about the settlement made by John Tregoz was pleaded only as to twenty-four acres, parcel of the land in question. As to the residue the plaintiff pleaded in a more general fashion that at the time of the recovery Humphrey Smyth was not seised of the freehold, and that therefore the recovery was void in law.

Maitland noted that at the time the report, characterised by a "rambling obscurity", was written up in the Year Book, the judgment did not actually seem to have been given, and could not locate the eventual record of judgment in the case itself. Puzzled by the "hypothetical state of facts" about which the four judges - including Chief Justice Bryan and Justice Littleton - in the forcible entry case had been arguing, Maitland determined:

Talkarum, the recoveror, having obtained judgement, did nothing more during the lifetime of Humphrey Smyth, the tenant in the action. Humphrey died seised: on his death Robert Smyth entered, and on Robert's death John Smyth entered. Then Talkarum entered on John and enfeoffed Henry Hunt, then John entered and cast out Hunt, and this was the forcible entry complained of [...] Leaving to Cornishmen the question whether Talkarum and Trevistarum are possible names, I cannot refrain from the remark that the name Henry Hunt is beautifully simple.

More recent research has shown that the background of Taltarum's Case was as follows. A man called Thomas Trevistarn granted land in Portreath to one William Smyth in fee tail. On William Smyth's death, his eldest son and heir Humphrey took possession of the land under the entail. Humphrey Smyth then conveyed part of the land to a man called John Tregoz, probably as part of a marriage settlement, and Tregoz accordingly reconveyed it back entailed on Humphrey and his wife Jane, with remainder to Humphrey's heirs. Humphrey's wife died childless, and he suffered a recovery of the land to another man, Thomas Talcarn (the person whose name was afterwards misspelt "Taltarum"). At this point, Humphrey probably believed that the recovery, in accordance with usual practice, would bar both existing entails. Talcarn, in turn, conveyed it to Henry Hunt - probably without even taking possession. However, on Humphrey Smyth's death, John Smyth, the son and heir of Humphrey's younger brother Robert, claimed possession of the land under the original entail, evicting Hunt. The case itself was concerned with Hunt's action on forcible entry against John Smyth. Hunt would be able to get a favourable judgment if he, and his lawyer John Catesby, could demonstrate that the recovery to Talcarn had destroyed the operation of the entail originally created by Trevistarn.

It also appears that a counter-action by Smyth - represented by Guy Fairfax - against Hunt, for writ of formedon in the descender, was going on at the same time as the forcible entry action by Hunt against Smyth, and that elements of the pleadings in the descender action became included with the report of the forcible entry action. This might explain the confusing and obscure nature of the reports. Smyth's success hinged on the argument that, at the time his uncle had suffered a recovery of the land to Talcarn, he was only in possession of the land under the later Tregoz entail to him and Jane, rather than the original Trevistarn entail: proving this would mean that John Smyth could still claim the land under the original entail.

The real significance of the case in later centuries lay in the principle that was extracted from the judges' arguments about how the common recovery worked, though many commentators got the details (and name) of the case itself wrong, having never seen the Plea Roll. Most authorities simply followed Sir Edward Coke, who stated that the common recovery began with "Taltarum's Case". It is now clear, however, that as a legal device, the common recovery predated 1472, possibly first appearing in the 1440s: Taltarum's Case added little beyond introducing, through the judges' deliberations, the device of the "double voucher", though this did not become part of the common recovery until the mid 16th century. Nevertheless it seems likely that the example of Taltarum's Case served to popularise the procedure, as the annual number of recoveries was far greater in the decade after 1472 than in the previous decade.
