= Robert Danby =

British justice (died 1474)

Sir Robert Danby, KS (died 1474) was a British justice.

== Life ==
He was the fifth son of Thomas Danby of Danby, Yorkshire, and his wife Mary, daughter of Sir Robert Tanfield. He adopted the legal profession, and occurs in the year-books as early as 1431. In 1441, he appeared in a case before the privy council, and, in 1443, was made serjeant-at-law, being promoted king's serjeant soon afterwards.

He seems never to have sat in parliament, but, on 28 June 1452, he was raised to the bench of common pleas. Being apparently of Yorkist sympathies, he was on 11 May 1461, immediately after the accession of Edward IV, appointed chief justice of common pleas. He was knighted soon afterwards. When Henry VI regained his throne Danby was, by patent dated 9 October 1470, continued as chief justice, but when Edward IV returned in the following year Danby ceased to be chief justice.

As he disappears from the list of judges three weeks before the others were removed, the circumstance may be due to his death, and not to his disgrace. The frequency with which Danby's opinion was quoted suggests that he was a judge of considerable weight. He was the judge in the recovery referred to in Taltarum's Case, which gave rise to the doctrine of the common recovery. In 1473, he joined the Corpus Christi Guild in York. He died in 1474 and was buried there shortly afterward.

== Family ==
He married, first, in 1444, Catherine, daughter of Ralph Fitzrandal, by whom he had no issue, and secondly Elizabeth, daughter and heiress of William Aslaby; by her he had a son, Sir James Danby, who succeeded to Thorp Perrow, Yorkshire, an estate his father had purchased, and died in 1496, and a daughter, Margaret, who married Christopher Barton. His great-grandson, Sir Christopher Danby, was, according to Paget, designed for a peerage by Henry VIII, but the intention was never carried out.

Legal offices
Preceded by Sir John Prysot	Chief Justice of the Common Pleas; 1461–1471	Succeeded by Sir Thomas Bryan
