= Entail Act =

Stock short title used in UK legislation

Entail Act (with its variations) is a stock short title used in the United Kingdom for legislation relating to entails.

== List ==
- The Entail (Scotland) Act 1914 (4 & 5 Geo. 5. c. 43)

The Entail Acts is the collective title of the following acts:

- The Entail Act 1685 (c. 26) [12mo ed: c 22] (S)
- The Tenures Abolition Act 1746 (20 Geo. 2. c. 50 ss 14, 15, 16, 17)
- The Sales to Crown Act 1746 (20 Geo. 2. c. 51 ss 2, 3)
- The Entail Improvement Act 1770 (10 Geo. 3. c. 51)
- The Entail Provisions Act 1824 (5 Geo. 4. c. 87)
- The Entail Powers Act 1836 (6 & 7 Will. 4. c. 42)
- The Entail Sites Act 1840 (3 & 4 Vict. c. 48)
- The Entail Amendment Act 1848 (11 & 12 Vict. c. 36)
- The Entail Amendment Act 1853 (16 & 17 Vict. c. 94)
- The Entail Cottages Act 1860 (23 & 24 Vict. c. 95)
- The Entail Amendment Act 1868 (31 & 32 Vict. c. 84)
- The Entail Amendment Act 1875 (38 & 39 Vict. c. 61)
- The Entail Amendment Act 1878 (41 & 42 Vict. c. 28)
- The Roads and Bridges (Scotland) Act 1878 (41 & 42 Vict. c. 51 s 70)
- The Roads Amendment Act 1880 (43 Vict. c. 7)
- The Entail (Scotland) Act 1882 (45 & 46 Vict. c. 53)

== See also ==
- List of short titles
