= Entail Act 1685 =

Act of the Parliament of Scotland

Entail Act 1685 (Note: The citation of this act by this short title was authorised by section 1 of, and the first schedule to, the Short Titles Act 1896. Due to the repeal of those provisions it is now authorised by section 19(2) of the Interpretation Act 1978.)
- Act of Parliament
- Parliament of Scotland
- Long title: An Act concerning tailzies. (Note: These words are printed against this act in the second column of the first schedule to the Short Titles Act 1896, which is headed "Title".)
- Citation: 1685 c. 26 (12mo ed: c. 22)
- Territorial extent: Scotland

Dates
- Royal assent: 30 May 1685
- Commencement: 23 April 1685 (Note: Start of session.)
- Repealed: 28 November 2004 (Note: The Abolition of Feudal Tenure etc. (Scotland) Act 2000 (Commencement No. 2) (Appointed Day) Order 2003 (SSI 2003/456).)
Other legislation
Amended by	Persons Forfeited Act 1690; Statute Law Revision (Scotland) Act 1906; Entail (Scotland) Act 1914
Repealed by	Abolition of Feudal Tenure etc. (Scotland) Act 2000

Status: Repealed

Revised text of statute as amended

The Entail Act 1685 (c. 26) [12mo ed: c. 22] was an act of the Parliament of Scotland which codified tailzies and. The act was one of the Entail Acts. It allowed entail settling heritable property inalienably on a specified line of heirs, restricting the rights of heirs.

== Subsequent developments ==
This act was disapplied by section 2 of the Entail (Scotland) Act 1914 (4 & 5 Geo. 5. c. 43).

The whole act was repealed by section 76(2)] of, and part I of schedule 13 to, the Abolition of Feudal Tenure etc. (Scotland) Act 2000, which came into force on 28 November 2004.Scottish Parliament. Abolition of Feudal Tenure etc. (Scotland) Act 2000 as amended (see also enacted form), from legislation.gov.uk.
