= Richard Newton (justice) =

British judge (died 1448)

Sir Richard Newton KS (died 13 December 1448) was a British justice. He was educated as a lawyer at Middle Temple, and created a Serjeant-at-law in 1425, followed by a promotion to King's Serjeant in 1430. By December of the same year he had also become Recorder of Bristol, where he had close ties; he also had links with Wales, where by September 1426 he had been appointed as an Itinerant justice to Humphrey, Duke of Gloucester at his court in Pembrokeshire. In 1438 he led a commission of Oyer and terminer in Carmarthenshire and Cardiganshire, and in November of that year he was appointed a justice of the Court of Common Pleas. Less than a year later on 17 September 1439 he was made Chief Justice of the Common Pleas, being granted £93 6s. 8d. as well as the usual fee. By July 1440 he had been knighted, and in 1441 he acted as an arbitrator to decide the dispute over the inheritance of Thomas Berkeley. He died on 13 December 1448 and was buried in St Mary's, Yatton, leaving money to finance a bell for the church.

Legal offices
Preceded by John Cottesmore	Chief Justice of the Common Pleas; 1439–1448	Succeeded by John Prysot
