= John Cottesmore =

British justice

His Worship John Cottesmore SL JP (died 29 August 1439) was a British justice of unknown origin. The first record of his work was in Oxfordshire in 1403, the location of much of his early legal work. In 1418 he was appointed to a Commission of the Peace for Oxford; by this point he was a Serjeant-at-law. In 1420 he was appointed to Commissions of the Peace for Cambridge and Cambridgeshire, as well as ones in East Anglia and the Midlands. At this point he also became an Assize justice, and in 1423 was created a King's Serjeant; in 1425 he was one of the King's Serjeants summoned to Parliament. On 15 October 1429 he was appointed as a justice for the Court of Common Pleas, which led to an increase in commissions and appointments; in 1437, for example, he was sent to Norwich with Marmaduke Lumley to oversee the mayoral elections, which, it was feared, would cause civil disturbances. On 20 January 1439 he was made Chief Justice of the Common Pleas, but served only briefly; he died on 29 August the same year.

Legal offices
Preceded by Sir John Juyn	Chief Justice of the Common Pleas; 1439	Succeeded by Sir Richard Newton
