= John Prysot =

English justice

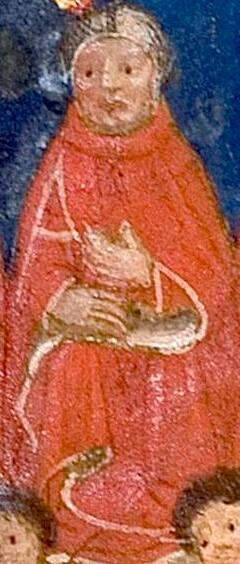
Depiction of a Chief Justice of the Common Pleas contemporary to Prysot's term in office

His Worship Sir John Prysot JP KS (died 1461) was an English justice.

== Biography ==
Records of his early life and career are sketchy, but from the late 1430s he was active in Cambridgeshire and Hertfordshire, starting as a Justice of the Peace in Cambridgeshire in 1437 followed by appointment as an Escheator for that county and for Huntingdonshire in 1438 and a second period of service as a justice of the peace in 1443, this time for Hertfordshire. In July of the same year he was made a Serjeant-at-law; the following year he was promoted to King's Serjeant. Between 1445 and 1447 he served as legal counsel for the Duchy of Lancaster, and in 1448 he was appointed an Assize Justice for Ely. His career took a sharp upturn when he was appointed Chief Justice of the Common Pleas on 16 January 1449 despite having never served as any kind of Puisne Justice.

Soon after his appointment he continued his activities outside Westminster, serving on a commission of Oyer and terminer in Kent in 1451 following the rebellion of Jack Cade by a similar commission in Lincolnshire in 1452 and at York in 1454. In the Parliaments of 1453 and 1455 he served as a Trier of Petitions from Gascony and other overseas territories. In 1455 he also served on a Hertfordshire commission raising funds for the defence of Calais, and in 1459 he became a Feoffee for various estates belonging to the Duchy of Lancaster, and was also knighted. He died early in 1461, and was buried in Wallington, Hertfordshire.

Legal offices
Preceded by Sir Richard Newton	Chief Justice of the Common Pleas; 1449–1461	Succeeded by Sir Robert Danby
