= Marriage settlement (England) =

Legal protection of assets during marriage under English Laws

A marriage settlement was a legally enforceable agreement made between the families of a bride and bridegroom intending marriage, specifying family assets from both parties that would be available to the couple during their marriage, commonly also reserving contingent portions of the marital assets to be available to the wife for her personal expenses, to support her in widowhood, and to provide for her offspring. While such arrangements have developed in many cultures of property law, commonly labelled as dowry and dower, they took very specific forms in England and Wales in the Early Modern period (1650 to 1850) due to the multiplicity of bodies of property law applying in England in this period, and also to the peculiarities of one of those bodies of law, the common law of England. Equivalent legal instruments are found in this period in other territories with legal jurisprudence deriving from English Common Law, such as colonial New England and the British West Indies.

The three major forms of marriage settlement in this period are commonly termed settlement by bond, strict settlement and separate estate. The latter two forms were generally found only amongst families with substantial landed property or inherited wealth, being created as trusts of land or other assets. The family's lawyers, as trustees, would be established as the legal owners of these assets, such that the bride and bridegroom would be beneficial owners during their lifetimes, which after their deaths, would descend to one or more of the children of the union, or otherwise as devised by will.

'Marriage settlements' are to be distinguished from 'bride prices' - payments from the family of the bridegroom to that of the bride (or sometimes vice versa), as too from prenuptual agreements made in anticipation of the contingency of a marriage being terminated by divorce or marital separation. In the Early Modern period, marriage settlements were ubiquitous amongst propertied families in England, and very common too across all other social classes, such that a bride's marriage portion in her settlement was considered to comprise a major element of her share in the inheritance due from her paternal family. Consequently, forms of marriage settlement also commonly acted as forms for overall inheritance shares, and vice versa.

While it remains common in England for the families of a married couple to contribute to their financial assets as a 'bottom drawer' or 'trousseau', the specific legal instruments that developed for marriage settlements in England fell out of use from 1850 onwards due to:

- Processes for unifying the various bodies of property law across England, curtailing or ending the separate jurisdictions of the ecclesiastical courts (Court of Probate Act 1857), manorial courts (Copyhold Acts), and the Court of Chancery in the Judicature Acts 1873 and 1875.
- Statutory provision for wives to retain their own assets in marriage in the Married Women's Property Act 1882.
- Development of a national system of statutory social security, replacing the operation of the Poor Laws.
- Reform of the laws of landed property, removing the status of entailed land in the Law of Property Act 1925.

== Purposes and context ==
Underlying the development of instruments for marriage settlement in England were a series of shared common cultural assumptions about marital property; which in this period commanded wide assent in general, even while it was recognised that they might conflict with one another in particular cases

- that the family patrimony, and in particular historic family land, should be maintained undivided as an inheritance in the family name for future generations of family members;
- that, when the male heir to property married, sufficient value from that property should be available to him and his bride to support their raising a family, even in advance of his coming into his full inheritance;
- that there should be constraints over the degree to which succession to the family property by an "unthrifty" or "wasteful" heir might extinguish the patrimony of succeeding generations;
- that in addition to the male heir of the family property, his sisters and younger brothers should be assured of a sufficient portion of inheritance to enable them to maintain their social status and marital prospects;
- that, if a wife survived her husband, the value of property she had brought into the marriage should be available to support her in her widowhood; and that after her own death it should be accessible to the offspring of that marriage;
- that, if a widow remarried, the value of property that she had received from her first marriage should continue to be accessible to support any offspring of that marriage.

In supporting the development of legal instruments to create marriage settlements, the courts would also take into account specific goals of public policy:

- that the intentions and aspirations of past generations should not be interpreted to constrain in perpetuity their successors as owners of the land in disposing or alienating this land;
- that the requirement on the executrix of a will to administer the deceased's estate should not be interpreted to require her to favour the creditors of the estate, or otherwise any stipulated beneficiaries in the will, to the extent that the widow and her offspring might avoidably be left destitute as a charge upon public funds under the Overseers of the Poor.

== Multiplicity of property laws in England ==
The ownership of property before the mid 19th century in England was subject to four distinct but overlapping bodies of law, each with its own courts and particular fields of application.

- The common law applied for the ownership and inheritance of agricultural 'freehold' land, and for debts and commercial contracts;
- Ecclesiastical law (and the ecclesiastical courts) applied for the inheritance of money and moveable property, and for the probate of wills. Before the 18th century, principles for the inheritance of moveable property in the ecclesiastical Province of York differed from those in the Province of Canterbury, while those for Wales and London differed again;
- Equity and the Court of Chancery applied for marriage settlements, guardianships, trusts and mortgages, but also provided remedies for some clearly unfair (inequitable) systematic outcomes from the rigidity of the common law.
- Local manorial Law and manorial courts applied for the ownership and inheritance of copyhold land, which comprised the bulk of historic residential land in villages, towns and cities. Each locality applied its own customary rules for manorial inheritance, varying from town to town.

Guiding principles in one body of law might be disregarded – or contradicted – in another. The doctrine of coverture may have acted to bar married women from having a distinct legal personality from their husbands in common law; but in the courts of ecclesiastical law, far the majority of executors receiving grants of probate or administration were female, married or not; and property held by an executrix did not fall under coverture, nor was the legal personality of an executrix subsumed into that of her husband.

Magna Carta (1215) had included clauses protecting wives' marriage portions, and widows' rights in dower from appropriation, and from seizure by their husbands' creditors, and each of the four bodies of English property law provided ancient instruments for assurance through marriage settlements of continuing incomes for widows out of their deceased husband's property; 'freebench' from copyhold land in manorial law, 'reasonable parts' from moveable property in ecclesiastical law, 'jointure' from a marriage settlement in equity, and 'dower' from freehold land in common law. In administering a deceased's estate under ecclesiastical law, these rights in widowhood took priority over unsecured creditors, or stipulations in the will. Dower and jointure functioned as legal alternatives; a widow without a jointure could always claim dower (assuming her husband owned real property). Equally, 'separate estate' and 'reasonable parts' were legal alternatives; a widow with a separate estate in equity could not claim reasonable parts of her husband's moveables.

The various legal instruments developed for marriage settlements in Early Modern England characteristically exploited the principles of ecclesiastical law or equity in order to circumvent or forestall aspects of the common law that might appear invidious for the management and inheritance of marital property in a forthcoming marriage. So the common law principle of primogeniture could be circumvented for moveable property in ecclesiastical law by partible inheritance; while the common law principle of coverture could be circumvented in her separate estate through the equitable devices of trusts.

The social environment of Early Modern England was highly litigious, such that the majority of households - across all levels of economic status - might expect to be involved in property litigation at some time in their existence. In consequence, courts and lawyers in the four bodies of law were to a degree in competition for business (and associated legal fees). Over this period, Parliament (whose membership was strongly dominated by common lawyers) enacted a series of statutes aimed at constraining the discretion of ecclesiastical and manorial courts; ultimately seeking to unify all four bodies of property law within the common law. But in doing so, it also proved necessary to enact by statute, remedies against the rigidities of the common law that had previously been accessible though these other courts.

== Particularities of the Common Law ==
Forms of marriage settlement in Early Modern England were primarily developed to circumvent some 'undesirable' effects of three particular doctrines of the common law:

- The Rule against Perpetuities. Under this doctrine, the capability of the current generation of property owners in a family to constrain the use, and potential disposal, of that property by future inheritors, was limited to those already born. To guard against potential spoliation of the family patrimony by a future unthrifty heir, marriage settlement instruments developed both to extend the scope for constraining conditions imposed by current owners to bind one further 'unborn' generation; and also to allow mechanisms for regular renewal (or 'resettlement') of constraints on the disposal of inherited property in each succeeding generation. The standard statement of this Rule was formulated in the early 18th century; but in practice, the common law courts had been striking down any legal device creating a perpetuity since 1614.
- Primogeniture. Under this doctrine in the common law, all freehold land, in the absence of a will would descend on the owner's death to their eldest male heir; to the exclusion of any younger brothers, or sisters. In the event of an intestate property owner having no male heirs, all daughters would inherit any freehold land in equal parts. Two 'undesirable' issues were seen in this. Unlike in some other European systems of male-preference primogeniture, the common law in England promoted a landowner's daughters' inheritance above their male cousins, so splitting the family patrimony and potentially alienating it from the family name through these daughters' marriages; but also, separately, that the concentration of family property into the hands of the eldest male heir could leave younger sons and daughters unprovided for. Marriage settlement instruments developed both to maintain, if possible, the family patrimony undivided within the family name - even in the event of there being no male heir for the current property owner; but also so as to provide mechanisms by which the reasonable portions for younger sons and daughters of the family could be assured out of income from the family patrimony.
- Coverture. Under this doctrine in the common law, all adult women were divided into one of two categories, termed (in legal French) 'femes sole' or 'femes covert'. As a 'feme sole', an unmarried or widowed adult woman in England enjoyed legal rights little different from that of an adult male; her legal actions were in no degree under the control or supervision of any adult male relative - whether parent, father-in-law, brother or legal guardian. But while married, an adult woman in common law in England became a 'feme covert' and her legal identity became almost entirely eclipsed by that of her husband; husband and wife became one legal person – and that person was the husband. A wife could not enter into legal contracts, nor could she sue or be sued in law independently of her husband. Any property she brought into the marriage, and any property she acquired or inherited during the marriage, fell under the control of her husband; who then had unrestricted access to any profits from it. She would retain legal title to any freehold lands, so that her husband could not sell these without her consent; but other property, including money, furniture, and agricultural produce, became her husband's, and he could dispose of them in his lifetime, and crucially his creditors could pursue them for his debts. A wife could not, during her marriage, make a will, unless with her husband's consent; and although a husband had a legal obligation to maintain his wife, since she had no separate identity she could not pursue him in law for his failure to do so.

Although almost all women in Early Modern England were married at some point in their lives, at any one time only around half were married, and so under coverture. As Amy Erikson has shown, the common law in England was unusual both in the degree of economic freedom enjoyed by adult women as 'femes sole', and in the degree of economic control foregone as 'femes covert'. "English property law was distinctive in two respects: first, married women under coverture were even more restricted than in the rest of Europe; second, single women enjoyed a position unique in Europe as legal individuals in their own right, with no requirement for a male guardian". Furthermore, since the overwhelming majority of estates-at-death were administered by women as 'executrices', and as property held as an executrix did not fall under coverture, a high proportion of the overall private asset-base of English households would at any one time, be in the possession of adult women. Families and households at all levels of economic status were consequently concerned to find ways to circumvent the possibility of family assets held by adult women as 'femes sole' subsequently being dissipated by a profligate husband due to coverture in common law, or swallowed up in paying his debts; and the ecclesiastical courts, and courts in equity, were in general ready to facilitate this in interpreting the terms marriage settlements. Nevertheless, all aspects of economic activity by single women were constrained by the ramifications of coverture, in that the risk of any single woman subsequently marrying - and so losing their independent legal personality - always remained an unknown quantity.

== Settlement by Bond ==
Far the simplest, cheapest, and far most common forms of marriage settlements were those established by bond. Such settlements are found at all levels of economic status. Before marriage a bride would identify specific property as her dowry to be brought into the marriage, and the bridegroom would then enter into a bond to make that same property (or its equivalent in value) available to his wife in widowhood, or after her death to her offspring. The complication being, that due to coverture, any bond directly between a bridegroom and bride would be void in common law on their marriage. This problem was resolved through the participation of a compliant 'bondsman', commonly a minister of religion or a local landowner, who would be party to the bond on behalf of the bride. Should the husband, or his executors after his death, fail to convey the specified property as set out in the bond within a set period (commonly six months after death), a penalty of twice the value of the property in question would notionally be due to the bondsman. The intention of the bond was to create a debt within the husband's estate, which could only be discharged through restoring the widow with her dowered property. On the face of it, this was an obvious contrivance to benefit the widow and her offspring to the disadvantage of her late husband's other creditors. Nevertheless, both ecclesiastical and common law courts would enforce these bonds, on the understandings;

- that the property in question had been brought into the marriage by the wife, and so remained morally 'hers' whatever coverture might indicate;
- that, as almost all estates-at-death were administered by a widow or daughter as executrix, so it would be both natural and proper for her to favour the needs of the deceased's family over other creditors, and she should not be penalised for doing so;
- that, when the deceased man's property might be encumbered in debt, the public interest was best served for those funds available to be directed first to his widow and children, so minimising any call upon the Overseers of the Poor.

Three forms of settlement by bond are found in Probate records:

- a bond to repay to the widow after death a sum equivalent to the value of specified property she had brought into the marriage;
- a bond to pay a sum equivalent to the value of specified property a remarrying widow had brought into the marriage from her previous marriage, as portions to the offspring of that marriage;
- a bond to convey specified property brought into the marriage by the bride into the notional ownership of the bondsman in trust for the bride's use during the marriage; and for her support in her widowhood, and otherwise for her offspring or as devised by her will.

This third form of bond corresponded in law to a 'separate estate' as detailed below, although this specific term is never used in the record; and similarly would be enforced as a trust through the Court of Chancery. The difference being that the bondsman, though legally a trustee, had no responsibility for managing the property in question, which remained in the hands of the wife during the marriage - who then enjoyed its income, but as a life tenant, so she could not sell it. But crucially, this property was protected from seizure by her husband's creditors. This third form of bond appears to have been used mainly in respect of properties with values of several hundred pounds (in the values of the day); rather more than for settlements of the first two forms, but much less than that for settlements where a full 'separate estate' was arranged with legal trustees.

== Strict Settlement ==
The Strict Settlement evolved from the middle of the 17th century in England primarily as a means to provide a marriage portion for the male heir to a historic landed estate from the landed assets of that estate, sufficient for the bridegroom's family to negotiate their side of a marriage settlement with the family of his prospective bride. So the key components of the strict settlement would be: a guarranteed annuity payable to the couple in their early marriage, the prospect of inherited possession of the landed estate on the death of the current landowner, and a conditional restriction on the further inheritance of the landed estate after the bridegroom's death, as only to his own (as yet unborn) male heir. The object being to maximise the likelihood of the family's historic lands succeeding undivided within the family name, so circumventing the degree to which the rules of primogenture in common law might split lands between daughters or female inheritors where a marriage had failed to produce a male heir, or through delay had produced no heir at all; while also circumventing the rule against perpetuities. Consequently, the strict settlement would always specify alternative lines of male succession, whether through younger sons, collateral male lines from an earlier forebear, or sometimes through male offspring of a daughter or a collateral female line. The terms of the strict settlement might be agreed when the marriage of the heir to the estate was in prospect, or otherwise when that heir attained the age of majority.

The basic form of conditional restriction of inheritance to male heirs only, was that of the entail, a legal instrument for determining in advance the inheritance of land across several generations, and each line of succession within the strict settlement comprised a separate entail. Entails in strict settlements generally limited inheritance in the male line, and were commonly assumed to do so; but could also be devised to forestall division of lands by limiting female inheritance to only one daughter in turn of seniority. Consequently, a 'strict settlement' in law was commonly referred to as 'the entail' in common parlance; the legal instruments themselves, when alluded to, being called 'simple entails'. As such, the simple entail already had a long and chequered history in governing inheritance of land in common law. Until around 1500 CE, inheritance of almost all major landed estates in England was controlled by 'unbreakable' and 'perpetual' entails in the male line, such that most landowners were legally only life tenants of their landed estates, and had little power to dispose of, or alienate land, other than to their male heirs at law. But then common recovery, a mechanism of collusive lawsuit, was developed to enable entails to be 'barred' and so terminated; while also both common law and statute law increasingly restricted the scope of legal instruments intended to prevent land from being alienated by future generations of owners, culminating in adoption of the rule against perpetuities in 1614. From 1500 to 1650 most great landowners enjoyed, in principle, almost unlimited power to dispose of their lands entail-free, to disinherit wayward offspring, or reward favoured ones. But that also opened the possibility that inheriting offspring in their turn might misuse or waste the family inheritance; so a different form of entail came into fashion within the structure of the strict settlement.

The simple entail consisted of an instrument from a landowner as 'settlor' (whether while living or in their will), granting land to the use of their heir during their life, and then to pass after their death to their own male heir. In this, the settlor remains as the 'tenant in possession' for the rest of their life; their immediate heir become a 'tenant for life', while the heir of the second generation is the 'tenant in tail' or otherwise the remainderman. Commonly, the 'tenant in possession' receives the profits from the land, the 'tenant for life' receives an annuity from the land, while the 'tenant in tail' receives no current income, but has legal title to the land. The development of legal restrictions against constraining landholding actions in future unborn generations had made it impossible for a simple entail to restrict inheritance to a 'tenant in tail' if they were yet unborn; but this was resolved in the 'strict settlement' by introducing a legal trustee - generally the family's lawyers - into the chain of ownership. In the mid 17th century, the Court of Chancery developed the principle of 'trustees for contingent remainders'. In this, the title to the landed estate now rested with the lawyers who managed the estate on behalf of the unborn heirs as contingent remaindermen, until there were such heirs and until they achieved legal majority. By this means, the strict settlement allowed the inheritance restrictions of the entail now to extend over one unborn generation. But for those restrictions to be reproduced indefinitely - as was indeed the practice for most historic estates in England from 1650 to 1925 - it was necessary for a whole apparatus of entails covering all possible lines of succession, to be 'resettled' successively in each generation when each 'tenant in tail' came of age. All the entails in the strict settlement would then be barred jointly by the current 'tenant in tail' in conjunction with the current 'tenant in possession'; and then renewed, with every person in the entail skipping a generation. So the current 'tenant in tail' now became a 'tenant for life' (and so able to receive an annuity from the estate); while the new 'tenant in tail' would now be the former tenant's own yet unborn male heir.

The procedure of each successive 'resettlement' not only allowed for the stipulations of the 'strict settlement' to be reproduced in a further generation, and for an annuity to be payable to the heir while his father lived; they also allowed a range of other payments to be agreed out of the profits from the estate under the control of the trustees. Chief amongst these might be:

- dower as annual payments for life to the heir's widowed mother, and possibly grandmother, should these be due;
- portions - as cash sums - to be payable to other offspring of the settlor. For the settlor's daughters - that is the sisters of the male heir to the estate - these portions would be expected to stand as their own dowries and would commonly be payable on their marriage or on their coming of age. For the male heir's younger brothers, their portions might enable their careers in a 'gentlemanly' profession; purchasing a commission in the Army, or paying for a university or legal education to enable a career in the Church or Law, and would be payable when they came of age. As such these too might facilitate, in part, these brothers acquiring future marital assets. There would commonly be a clause in the settlement requiring the heir to settle dower and all outstanding portions to his siblings on the death of the settlor, as a condition for the heir's entry into full possession of the estate;
- portions - commonly as a global cash sum - to be payable out of the estate to the unborn younger sons and daughters of the heir. Commonly there was a clause in the settlement allowing the heir, as father, to determine the distribution of the portions due under his settlement to his own children. Or there might be no sums specified in this category, supposing that the level of required portions might better determined in the next successive resettlement, at the majority of the heir's own eldest son;

On the other hand, the strict settlement would not normally make any provision for payments specific to the heir's future wife - such as pin-money or widow's jointure; these elements of the marriage settlement were commonly reckoned rather as being due from the contribution to the marriage settlement of the bride's family - and so, should fall under her 'separate estate'. All settled annuities and portions would be paid directly by the trustees to the recipients in question; the recipients' father, as 'tenant in possession' now had no power to withhold them altogether (though he might vary their distribution). Almost always, the trustees would fund the payment of portions, as large ad-hoc cash sums, through raising mortgages on the landed estate; subsequent mortgage repayments being creamed-off from the profits of the land before the 'tenant in possession' could receive them. If it appeared that settled obligations could not be balanced within the current estate income, then the trustees might consider felling timber on the estate; or even selling off portions of ancestral land at the next resettlement, but this was a last resort.

The adoption of the strict settlement represented for landowners a major relinquishing of economic power over their offspring and estates; they now could not themselves raise mortgages on their land, nor could they undertake new building projects other than with the consent of the trustees, and they could not disinherit errant offspring once they were of age. Nevertheless. Lawrence Stone reports the strict settlement as having been broadly successful in its ostensible objective of maintaining landed estates in the family name. All estates at one time or another might be expected to fall into the hands of an 'unthrifty' heir; almost all regularly experienced failure in the male line for any of a current generation of offspring; and almost all at some point in the period passed through female succession, and so were at risk of passing out of the family name altogether. But with very few exceptions, the entails held up; subsequent sound management recovered estates encumbered with debt, collateral relatives were found to inherit, and if need be trustees proved able to allow an inheritance in the female line - commonly with an insistence that the ancient family name be adopted as the married surname, replacing or in addition to the husband's name. But the majority of ancient landed estates continued in England in this period to be maintained with their historic lands under a recognisable version of their historic family name.

It would always be possible that a 'tenant in tail', on coming of age, would not agree to the proposed resettlement. So long as he did not marry in the interim and engender a male heir, he might wait until his father died and then bar the entail through common recovery. He could then sell the estate outright if he wanted to, and would be under no legal obligations to his mother, siblings, offspring, or the family name. But both the cultural expectation that the entail would continue, and the uncertain prospect of life without the guaranteed annuity available following resettlement, almost invariably resulted in his acquiescing. Where a strict settlement was terminated, this was commonly achieved through the collusion of both parent and heir, or otherwise through the failure of any entails in the settlement to have produced a surviving male heir.

== Separate Estate ==
As the Strict Settlement' had evolved to structure the bridegroom's family's contribution to a marriage settlement, so the separate estate evolved to structure the contribution to marriage of the bride's family. Just as was the case with the strict settlement, this involved the use of lawyers as trustees, and equally so, these instruments were enforced through the law of equity and the Court of Chancery. The basic form of the separate estate was for specified property from the bride's family - most usually land, money or interest-bearing securities - to be placed under trustees for her 'sole and separate use' during her marriage; and should she survive the marriage, to support her in widowhood and to be passed to her offspring or otherwise as devised in her will. As such, this circumvented the common law doctrine of coverture, such that the Court of Chancery held that, in respect of her separate estate, a wife was 'feme sole'.

Generally, the trustees would maintain the separate estate as a secure fund; which they would aim to increase during the course of the marriage through accumulated interest. The marriage settlement would specify annual payments that would be expected to be sourced from the fund's income; and so might include:

- pin-money. This was an annual sum that would be paid to the wife during the marriage for her own disposal, under no control from her husband;
- jointure. This was the notional annual value of the money to be paid to the wife should she survive the marriage as a widow. The standard rule of thumb was that the agreed jointure on widowhood should be around 10% of the total value of the marriage portion that the bride had brought into the marriage. Where a widow had a jointure agreed in her marriage settlement, she would not be entitled to claim dower.
- portions to offspring from a first marriage. Where a widow remarried, the property she maintained from her previous marriage would commonly be placed into separate estate in trust for the children of that marriage.
- payments at the discretion of the trustees. as a general rule, the wife's specified pin-money would not exhaust the income from the separate estate fund; and wives could seek approval for specific special reasons - including for payments to be made directly to her husband as loans or gifts. Trustees sometimes expressed concern that a husband might "kiss or kick" his wife into transferring her money to his control; but the courts would allow such payments subject to assurances;
- devising of property by will. Under coverture, a wife could not make a will except with the consent of her husband; but marriage settlements with separate estate commonly included an agreement for the wife to be able to devise moveable property by will; rather than the passing necessarily to her legal heirs. Settled land, on the other hand, must pass to her heirs.

Most separate estates were established by brides before marriage - especially where this was widow's second marriage; but, due to coverture, a wife could not establish a separate estate during the marriage itself. But another party could do so (including often her husband, either during the marriage or as part of the negotiated marriage settlement to ensure her jointure); as for instance where a testator was bequeathing property to a married woman and did not want it to come under the control of her husband in coverture. In some circumstances, the Court of Chancery might be petitioned to reserve property coming into the wife's ownership into a separate estate for the duration of the marriage. Most usually, both income and capital in the separate estate were reserved for the wife's use and disposal, especially when this was reckoned as her share of her father's inheritance; but separate estate could also be specified as providing income only.

== Marriage Settlements in English Culture ==
Marriage Settlements in Early Modern England were usually negotiated by the parents or guardians of the bridegroom and bride, not by the principals themselves; and for propertied families, commonly required extensive legal input from each family's lawyers. From the pespectives of the couple, there are frequent complaints in letters and reports about the protracted delays common in these negotiations, espectially since much of the legal apparatus associated with marriage settlements appeared to be directed more to maintaining each family's respective property, than in support for the couple marrying.

In respect of the two specific instruments for marriage settlements set out here - the strict settlement and the separate estate - the strict settlement, and its associated expectations of constrained landed inheritance in the male line within the family name, was commonly understood as a fact of life. Whereas the separate estate was widely reviled in print debate as 'unromantic' and 'improper'; the argument being that a good bride should only need her own virtue to support her in marriage, so maintaining separate monies as a precaution implied both a limitation in her own virtue, and a lack of confidence in that of her husband. Bound up in this, and the subject of continual comment, was the startling inflation in the value daughters' marriage portions over the Early Modern Period, specific to the families of the landed gentry and aristocracy; which many attributed in part to the legal constraints against their being accessible for the husband's use.

== Modern status ==
The marriage contract was in common use from the earliest times, and throughout the Middle Ages up through the 1930s. It is little used today in modern England and Wales for to several reasons, including the disuse of the giving of dowries, the establishment of the legal power of married women to own assets in their own right, following the Married Women's Property Act 1882; the lesser involvement and powers of parents in selecting marriage partners, the abandonment by modern society of the aspiration to establish dynasties, the introduction of death duties, the abandonment of primogeniture as a desirable social model, and the comparatively modern trend of the "working wife and mother", who earns her own money and is often financially independent of her husband.
