= The Quincunx =

1989 novel by Charles Palliser

- First edition
- Author: Charles Palliser
- Illustrator: Jenny Phillips
- Cover artist: Benjamin Haydon (first edition), Volker Strater (UK Paperback), James Hutcheson (US editions)
- Language: English
- Genre: Historical fiction
- Publisher: Canongate Publishing
- Publication date: 1989
- Publication place: UK
- Media type: Print (Hardcover and Paperback)
- Pages: 1221 pp.
- ISBN: 0-345-37113-5
- OCLC: 23069665

The Quincunx (The Inheritance of John Huffam) is the epic 1989 debut novel of Charles Palliser. It takes the form of a Dickensian mystery set in early 19th century England, with added modern attributes of an ambiguous plot and unreliable narrators. Many of the puzzles that are apparently solved in the story have alternative solutions hidden in the subtext.

== Plot introduction ==
The novel begins in London with a secret meeting between two legal men. A bribe reveals the confidential details of a correspondent who is the link to a vital hidden document. Meanwhile, young John Mellamphy is growing up in the remote countryside with his mother Mary, ignorant of the name of Huffam and his family history. Gradually it becomes clear to him that they are threatened by the search for the document.

== Plot details ==
1. An attempted burglary tempts Mary to show her hand. She possesses a codicil to a will which is valuable to the Mompesson family, owners of a nearby estate. Meanwhile, John begins to suspect he is descended from the Huffams, the original owners of the estate. Mary is put under further pressure by the death of her protector in London, Mr Fortisquince, and by subsequent treacherous advice which persuades her into a loss-making property speculation. She reluctantly visits Sir Perceval Mompesson, who wishes to buy the codicil. At the Hall, John encounters Henrietta Palphramond and her governess, Miss Quilliam. The codicil is not sold, but later an attempt is made to abduct John; it is possible that his death would alter the inheritance of the estate. To escape, John and his mother travel to London.
2. With dwindling savings, John and his mother are forced into successively poorer lodgings and are pursued by bailiffs. They find refuge with the Isbister family, but flee when they discover they are amongst the body-snatchers of Bethnal Green. They discover Miss Quilliam, who takes them in. Mary decides to sell the codicil to the Mompessons, but then fears betrayal and they flee to Fortisquince's widow. The codicil is purchased on condition that John goes to a school in the north. More debts wipe out Mary's gains and force Mary into a debtors' prison. John meets with cruelty and danger at the school and escapes back to London. He finds Mary who has gotten out of prison only by becoming a prostitute. On reencountering John she leaves that life but, still penniless, she ultimately dies of consumption.
3. John seeks out Henry Bellringer, who is a relation of a school friend. But instead he finds himself among a gang of thieves, living in a part-built mansion. There he reads his mother's journal, which gives tantalisingly incomplete details of his parentage, of the death of his grandfather, and of the legacy. If John dies, others could inherit. Eventually John escapes from the gang and a kindly household takes him in. But their act is not what it seems, for they are part of the Clothier family, to whom the codicil was unwittingly sold. With John as their ward, they aim to inherit by having him sent to an insane asylum. It is there John meets Peter Clothier, whom he now knows as his father.
4. John escapes from the asylum with the help of the Digweed family, whom he once encountered in the countryside. He starts a new life with them, surviving by scavenging the sewers of London. He visits Jeoffrey Escreet, who tells the story of the murder of Mary's father. John resolves to take the name of Huffam. His salvation may lie in a second will, hidden in the Mompessons' London house. After a failed burglary he gets a job as a servant at the house, where he reencounters Henrietta Palphramond. He learns more of the codicil, and that the second will may mean the legacy goes to her. Eventually John steals the will and flees.
5. John again seeks out Henry Bellringer to help him take advantage of the will. But Bellringer betrays him to another potential legatee, Silas Clothier. Clothier burns the will and attempts to murder John, but John escapes and Clothier dies. A Maliphant claimant comes forward anonymously. But it emerges that the burnt will was only a copy and that Bellringer has the original. With that, it is possible for Bellringer to win the inheritance by marrying Henrietta. During a storm, John interrupts a secret marriage ceremony between them in a derelict chapel at Mompesson hall. Bellringer is killed by David Mompesson, who flees the country. As the book draws to a close John finally comes within reach of the inheritance. As he does so he loses his original heroic character, becoming cynical and dismissive of his past friends. At the last moment it is revealed that the inheritance is still being determined in Chancery and may be worth nothing because of debts. With the outcome unresolved the story ends.

== Style ==
The Quincunx was a surprise bestseller. It is notable for its portrayal of 19th century England, covering the breadth of society from the gentry to the poor and from provincial villages to metropolitan London, and its dealing with the eccentricities of English land law. In a review citing parallels with Great Expectations, Little Dorrit, Our Mutual Friend, Martin Chuzzlewit, The Pickwick Papers, Oliver Twist and Nicholas Nickleby, Michael Malone has written that, "Mr. Palliser appears to have set out not merely to write a Dickens novel but to write all Dickens novels". But Palliser looked beyond Dickens for his depiction of the social conditions, drawing on Mayhew's London Labour and the London Poor.

J. Hillis Miller points out that, "The conventions ... of Dickens’ novels, are made salient through parody and exaggeration, just as a postmodern building makes the fragility and artifice of those old styles evident..." But Palliser differs from Dickens in that there are "no benevolent father figure, no guiding Providence, almost no good people, no guarantee that justice will eventually be done, nothing, for the most part, but uncertainty and prolonged suffering. It is as though Palliser were saying: 'Let me show you what things were really like at that time'."

The book is deeply researched. For example, the plot turns on an aspect of inheritance law - the distinction between a fee simple and a base fee with a remainderman. Another crucial point is the timing of John Huffam's birth, indicated by reference to contemporary events such as the Ratcliff Highway murders, the Great Comet of 1811, Wellington's capture of Ciudad Rodrigo, and the passing of the Rose act determining how parish register entries should be made. On another level the hero's name hints that the author may have given him the same birth date as Charles John Huffam Dickens.

== Structure ==
The novel has a fivefold structure. Each of the five parts takes the name of one of the families linked to the inheritance. Each part is then divided into five books, and each book is divided into five chapters.

At the beginning of each part, a quincunx of quatrefoil roses from the relevant family's arms are displayed. These then reappear as a count of one to five roses at the start of each Book. At the end of the novel all five families' devices are combined in a larger design, a quincunx of quincunxes. The pattern of narration of the 125 chapters - John Huffam, an omniscient narrator and a third person - exactly matches the colour pattern - white, black and red - of the 125 elements of the design. The mixture of first-person and detached narration is similar to the alternation between Esther Summerson's story and a neutral point of view in Bleak House. Palliser also notes that the heart of the book is an account taken from a journal which has a further subdivision into five "Relations" and a central ambiguity made by some missing pages. The information in the journal (as John Huffam suggests obliquely at the end of the book) is a key to reinterpreting all the events.

The design of the five families' devices is also important within the story, when it is the key to the secret hiding place of the second will.

At the end of each Part of 25 chapters, a partially revealed family tree is given, showing the relationships as John so far understands them.

The book also includes extracts from Richard Horwood's 1813 map showing key locations in London. The rural locations are, however, fictional. Although the central settlement is on the York-London road and shares its name with Hougham in Lincolnshire the story contradicts this identification by placing it 159 miles from London.

== Awards ==
Sue Kaufman Prize for First Fiction 1991
