= Rule in Wild's Case =

Rule of legal interpretation

The Rule in Wild's Case is a common law rule of construction that was formulated in a case before the Court of King's Bench in 1599. It concerns a particular type of ambiguity in devises (such as grants or bequests) of real property: If a grantor (O) grants, by deed or will, property to another person (A) with the language "To A and her children", who gets lawful possession of the property?

"Wild's Case" concerned some land that had been inherited via a remainder to "Rowland Wild and his wife, and after their decease to their children." Wild and his wife had died, and their son had died; should the son's daughter have the land?

in Lord Coke's (Note: Sir Edward Coke was a senior judge, a Lord of Appeal in Ordinary colloquially known as a Law Lord, thus called Lord Coke although he did not hold a peerage.) report of Wild's Case two propositions were stated which have become known as the "First Resolution in Wild's Case" and the "Second Resolution in Wild's Case":

1. If A has no children, the language is construed to create an estate tail (fee tail).
2. If A has children, the language is construed as a gift to A and his children equally as co-tenants.

This rule has fallen into disuse in those jurisdictions which no longer recognize the fee tail as a legal estate. Some U.S. states ignore the rule altogether, and interpret such a grant as giving a life estate and creating a remainder in her children. Section 14.2 of the Restatement (Third) of Property repudiates the Rule in Wild's Case, suggesting that many authorities consider it to be obsolete.

== Reading ==
Dukeminier, Jesse, Johansen, Stanley M., Lindgren, James, and Sitkoff, Robert. Wills, Trusts, and Estates, 7th Edition, p. 664. Aspen Publishers, 2005. ISBN 0-7355-3695-3
