= List of acts of the Parliament of Scotland from 1685 =

This is a list of acts of the Parliament of Scotland for the year 1685.

It lists acts of Parliament of the old Parliament of Scotland, that was merged with the old Parliament of England to form the Parliament of Great Britain, by the Union with England Act 1707 (c. 7).

For other years, see list of acts of the Parliament of Scotland. For the period after 1707, see list of acts of the Parliament of Great Britain.

== 1685 ==
The 1st session of the parliament of James VII, held in Edinburgh from 23 April 1685.

Short title, or popular name	Citation	Royal assent
Long title
Protestant Religion Act 1685 (repealed)	1685 c. 1 (Note: This is the citation in the Record Edition.); 1685 c. 1 (Note: This is the citation in the Duodecimal Edition.)	28 April 1685
Act for security of the Protestant Religion. Act for security of the Protestant Religion. (Repealed by Statute Law Revision (Scotland) Act 1906 (6 Edw. 7. c. 38))
Supply Act 1685 (repealed)	1685 c. 2; 1685 c. 2	28 April 1685
A Declaration and offer of Duty by the Kingdome of Scotland with ane annexation of the Excise to the Crown. A Declaration and offer of Duty by the Kingdome of Scotland with an annexation of the Excise to the Crown. (Repealed by Statute Law Revision (Scotland) Act 1906 (6 Edw. 7. c. 38))
Treason Act 1685 (repealed)	1685 c. 3; 1685 c. 3	6 May 1685
Act concerning Citations in Processes for Treason. Act concerning Citations in Processes for Treason. (Repealed by Statute Law Revision (Scotland) Act 1906 (6 Edw. 7. c. 38))
Treason (No. 2) Act 1685 (repealed)	1685 c. 4; 1685 c. 4	6 May 1685
Act concerning Witnesses in Processes for Treason. Act concerning Witnesses in Processes for Treason. (Repealed by Statute Law Revision (Scotland) Act 1906 (6 Edw. 7. c. 38))
Covenants Act 1685 (repealed)	1685 c. 5; 1685 c. 5	6 May 1685
Act declaring it treason to take or owne the Covenants. (Repealed by Statute Law Repeal (No. 3) Act 1690 (c. 58))
Attendance at Ordinances Act 1685 (repealed)	1685 c. 6; 1685 c. 6	6 May 1685
Act obliging Husbands to be lyable for their wyves fynes for withdrawing from the ordinances. (Repealed by Statute Law Repeal (No. 2) Act 1690 (c. 57) and 1690 (c. 58))
Treason (No. 3) Act 1685 (repealed)	1685 c. 7; 1685 c. 7	6 May 1685
Act approving the Sentence of Forfaulture against John Porterfield sometime of Duchall and anent the concealing of Supply given to Rebells. (Repealed by Statute Law Repeal (No. 3) Act 1690 (c. 58))
Conventicles Act 1685 (repealed)	1685 c. 8; 1685 c. 8	8 May 1685
Act against Preachers at Conventicles and hearers at field Conventicles. (Repealed by Statute Law Repeal (No. 2) Act 1690 (c. 57) and Statute Law Repeal (No. 3) Act 1690 (c. 58))
Crown Rents Act 1685 (repealed)	1685 c. 9; 1685 c. 9	8 May 1685
Act for the more effectuall payment and inbringing of his Majestys Rents and Revenues. Act for the more effectual payment and collection of his Majesty's Rents and Revenues. (Repealed by Statute Law Revision (Scotland) Act 1906 (6 Edw. 7. c. 38))
Judicial Confessions Act 1685 (repealed)	1685 c. 10; 1685 c. 10	8 May 1685
Act concerning Judicial Confessions before the Commissioners of Justiciary. Act concerning Judicial Confessions before the Commissioners of Justiciary. (Repealed by Statute Law Revision (Scotland) Act 1906 (6 Edw. 7. c. 38))
Refusal of Office Act 1685 (repealed)	1685 c. 11; 1685 c. 11	8 May 1685
Act obliging persons to accept Offices laid on them by the King or Council. Act obliging persons to accept Offices laid on them by the King or Council. (Repealed by Statute Law Repeal (No. 2) Act 1690 (c. 57) and Statute Law Repeal (No. 3) Act 1690 (c. 58))
Supply (No. 2) Act 1685 (repealed)	1685 c. 12; 1685 c. 12	13 May 1685
Act of Supply. Act of Supply. (Repealed by Statute Law Revision (Scotland) Act 1906 (6 Edw. 7. c. 38))
Test Act 1685 (repealed)	1685 c. 13; 1685 c. 13	13 May 1685
Act for taking the Test. Act for taking the Test. (Repealed by Statute Law Repeal (No. 2) Act 1690 (c. 57) and Statute Law Repeal (No. 3) Act 1690 (c. 58))
Prescription Act 1685 (repealed)	1685 c. 14; 1685 c. 14	13 May 1685
Act explaining the nynth act of the Parliament 1669 (Note: Prescription Act 1669 (c. 14)) concerning Prescriptions. Act explaining the ninth act of the Parliament of 1669 concerning Prescriptions. (Repealed by Prescription and Limitation (Scotland) Act 1973 (c. 52))
Interruptions Act 1685 (repealed)	1685 c. 15; 1685 c. 15	13 May 1685
Act explaining the tenth act of the Parliament 1669 (Note: Interruptions Act 1669 (c. 15)) anent Interruptions. Act explaining the tenth act of the Parliament of 1669 about Interruptions. (Repealed by Statute Law Revision (Scotland) Act 1964 (c. 80))
Justices of Peace Act 1685 (repealed)	1685 c. 16; 1685 c. 16	13 May 1685
Act anent Justices of Peace. (Repealed by Statute Law Repeal (No. 3) Act 1690 (c. 58))
Not public and general	1685 c. 17 — (Note: This act is not listed in the Duodecimal Edition.)	13 May 1685
Act approveing the Sentence of Forfaulture against Robert Hamilton somtime of Munkland.
Not public and general	1685 c. 18 —	13 May 1685
Act ratifying and approving the late Earle of Argyles forfaulture.
Not public and general	1685 c. 19 —	13 May 1685
Act approving the Sentence of forfaulture against Mr Robert Baillie some time of Jerriswood.
Not public and general	1685 c. 20 —	13 May 1685
Act in favours of George Viscount of Tarbat for changing ane High way.
Oath of Allegiance Act 1685 (repealed)	1685 c. 21; 1685 c. 17	22 May 1685
Act for taking the Oath of Alledgeance. (Repealed by Statute Law Repeal (No. 3) Act 1690 (c. 58))
Vacant Stipends Act 1685 (repealed)	1685 c. 22; 1685 c. 18	22 May 1685
Act concerning Vacant Stipends. Act concerning Vacant Stipends. (Repealed by Statute Law Revision (Scotland) Act 1906 (6 Edw. 7. c. 38))
College of Justice Act 1685 (repealed)	1685 c. 23; 1685 c. 18	22 May 1685
Act ratifieing the Privileges of the Senators of the Colledge of Justice. Act ratifying the Privileges of the Senators of the College of Justice. (Repealed by Statute Law Revision (Scotland) Act 1906 (6 Edw. 7. c. 38))
Game Act 1685 (repealed)	1685 c. 24; 1685 c. 18	30 May 1685
Act for preserving Game. Act for preserving Game. (Repealed by Statute Law Revision (Scotland) Act 1906 (6 Edw. 7. c. 38))
Theft of Dogs and Hawks Act 1685 (repealed)	1685 c. 25; 1685 c. 18	30 May 1685
Act against Stealing of Dogs and Haulks. Act against Stealing of Dogs and Hawks. (Repealed by Statute Law Revision (Scotland) Act 1906 (6 Edw. 7. c. 38))
Entail Act 1685 (repealed)	1685 c. 26; 1685 c. 22	30 May 1685
Act concerning Tailyies. (Repealed by Abolition of Feudal Tenure etc. (Scotland) Act 2000 (asp 5))
Trade Act 1685 (repealed)	1685 c. 27 —	30 May 1685
Act for a Commission of Trade. Act for a Commission of Trade. (Repealed by Statute Law Revision (Scotland) Act 1906 (6 Edw. 7. c. 38))
Manufactories Act 1685 (repealed)	1685 c. 28 —	30 May 1685
Act concerning Trade and Manufactorys. (Repealed by Statute Law Revision (Scotland) Act 1906 (6 Edw. 7. c. 38))
Refusals to Depone Act 1685 (repealed)	1685 c. 29; 1685 c. 23	2 June 1685
Act ratifieing the opinion of the Lords of Session anent these who refuse to depone anent the late treasonable Proclamation. (Repealed by Statute Law Repeal (No. 3) Act 1690 (c. 58))
Adjudications Act 1685 (repealed)	1685 c. 30; 1685 c. 26	2 June 1685
Act concerning Adjudications for Fynes. (Repealed by Statute Law Repeal (No. 3) Act 1690 (c. 58))
Rebels Act 1685 (repealed)	1685 c. 31; 1685 c. 25	2 June 1685
Act ratifieing tuo Acts of Parliament a Proclamation of Councill anent apprehending of Rebells. (Repealed by Statute Law Repeal (No. 3) Act 1690 (c. 58))
Citations Act 1685 (repealed)	1685 c. 32; 1685 c. 29	2 June 1685
Act concerning Citations before Circuit Courts. Act concerning Citations before Circuit Courts. (Repealed by Statute Law Revision (Scotland) Act 1906 (6 Edw. 7. c. 38))
Sea Passengers Act 1685 (repealed)	1685 c. 33; 1685 c. 27	2 June 1685
Act for Securing of Sea Passengers. Act for Securing of Sea Passengers. (Repealed by Statute Law Repeal (No. 3) Act 1690 (c. 58))
Tenants Act 1685 (repealed)	1685 c. 34; 1685 c. 24	2 June 1685
Act ordaining that Tennents be obliged by their Tacks to live regularly. (Repealed by Statute Law Repeal (No. 2) Act 1690 (c. 57))
Teind Commission Act 1685 (repealed)	1685 c. 35; 1685 c. 28	2 June 1685
Act and Commission for Plantation of Kirks and Valuation of Teinds. (Repealed by Statute Law Revision (Scotland) Act 1906 (6 Edw. 7. c. 38))
Plot Act 1685 (repealed)	1685 c. 36; 1685 c. 30	4 June 1685
Act approving the Narrative of the Plot. (Repealed by Statute Law Repeal (No. 3) Act 1690 (c. 58))
Militia Act 1685 (repealed)	1685 c. 37; 1685 c. 32	4 June 1685
Act concerning the Militia. Act concerning the Militia. (Repealed by Statute Law Revision (Scotland) Act 1906 (6 Edw. 7. c. 38))
Poll Money Act 1685 (repealed)	1685 c. 38; 1685 c. 34	4 June 1685
Act for Poll-money. (Repealed by Statute Law Revision (Scotland) Act 1906 (6 Edw. 7. c. 38))
Records Act 1685 (repealed)	1685 c. 39; 1685 c. 33	4 June 1685
Act for Security of the Records. (Repealed by Records Act 1686 (c. 42))
Messengers' Fees Act 1685 (repealed)	1685 c. 40; 1685 c. 35	4 June 1685
Act anent Messengers Fees. (Repealed by Statute Law Revision (Scotland) Act 1906 (6 Edw. 7. c. 38))
Officers of State Act 1685 (repealed)	1685 c. 41; 1685 c. 31	4 June 1685
Act for Security of the Officers of State and others. (Repealed by Statute Law Revision (Scotland) Act 1906 (6 Edw. 7. c. 38))
Ross-shire Act 1685 (repealed)	1685 c. 42 —	4 June 1685
Act in favours of George Viscount of Tarbat dissolving the Barrony of Tarbat from the Shire of Ross. (Repealed by Statute Law Revision (Scotland) Act 1906 (6 Edw. 7. c. 38))
Not public and general	1685 c. 43 —	4 June 1685
Act in favours of Sr George Mckenzie of Rosehaugh his Majesties Advocat disjoining the lands of Pittonarchie &c. from the shire of Ross.
Not public and general	1685 c. 44 —	4 June 1685
Act in favours of the Burgh of Inverness for exacting a small Custom at the Bridge thereof.
Earl of Argyle Act 1685 (repealed)	1685 c. 45; 1685 c. 36	11 June 1685
Act anent the address of the Estates of Parliament of His Majestys ancient Kingdom of Scotland, To His Sacred Majesty against the Arch Traitor Archbald Campbell sometime Earle of Argyle. (Repealed by Statute Law Repeal (No. 3) Act 1690 (c. 58))
Clergy Act 1685 (repealed)	1685 c. 46; 1685 c. 37	12 June 1685
Act for the Clergy. Act for the Clergy. (Repealed by Statute Law Repeal (No. 3) Act 1690 (c. 58))
Registration Act 1685 (repealed)	1685 c. 47; 1685 c. 38	12 June 1685
Act concerning the Registration of Writs in the Books of Session. (Repealed by Statute Law Revision (Scotland) Act 1906 (6 Edw. 7. c. 38))
Earl of Argyle (No. 2) Act 1685 (repealed)	1685 c. 48 —	12 June 1685
Act for a Commission anent the Estate of Archibald Campbel late Earle of Argyle. (Repealed by Argyle Act 1686 (c. 39))
Enclosing Ground Act 1685 (repealed)	1685 c. 49; 1685 c. 39	12 June 1685
Act in favours of Planters and Inclosers of Ground. (Repealed by Statute Law Revision (Scotland) Act 1906 (6 Edw. 7. c. 38))
Not public and general	1685 c. 50; 1685 c. 54	12 June 1685
Act in favors of S^{r} William Bruce of Kinross Baronet for enlarging the Shyre of Kinross.
Greenland Fishing Act 1685 (repealed)	1685 c. 51; 1685 c. 41	16 June 1685
Act declaring the Greenland fishing to be a Manufactory. (Repealed by Statute Law Revision (Scotland) Act 1906 (6 Edw. 7. c. 38))
Not public and general	1685 c. 52 —	16 June 1685
Act remitting the Process of Treason against the aires of James Earle of Lowdoun, Sir James Dalrymple of Stair and others, to the Justice Court.
Annexation Act 1685 (repealed)	1685 c. 53; 1685 c. 42	16 June 1685
Act of Annexation of severall Lands to the Crown. (Repealed by Statute Law Repeal (No. 3) Act 1690 (c. 58))
Not public and general	1685 c. 54 —	16 June 1685
Act reducing the Conversion of the ancient few Duties of the Estate of Argyle.
Annexation (No. 2) Act 1685 (repealed)	1685 c. 55; 1685 c. 40	16 June 1685
Act of Annexation of the Offices belonging to the late Earle of Argyle. (Repealed by Statute Law Repeal (No. 3) Act 1690 (c. 58))
Orkney and Shetland Act 1685 (repealed)	1685 c. 56; 1685 c. 43	16 June 1685
Act in favours of the Inhabitants of Orkney and Zetland. (Repealed by Statute Law Revision (Scotland) Act 1906 (6 Edw. 7. c. 38))
Regulation of Judicatories Act 1685 (repealed)	1685 c. 57 —	16 June 1685
Commission for Regulation of Inferior Judicatories. (Repealed by Statute Law Revision (Scotland) Act 1906 (6 Edw. 7. c. 38))
Not public and general	1685 c. 58 —	16 June 1685
Act in favours of the Bishop of the Isles.
Measures Act 1685 (repealed)	1685 c. 59; 1685 c. 44	16 June 1685
Act for a Standart of Myles. (Repealed by Statute Law Revision (Scotland) Act 1906 (6 Edw. 7. c. 38))
Not public and general	1685 c. 60 —	16 June 1685
Act for sowing pease and beans and Inhibiting the casting up of ground with in the shire of Aberdeen.
Not public and general	1685 c. 61 —	16 June 1685
Act in favors of the Children of S^{r} William Primrose of Caringtoun.
Not public and general	1685 c. 62 —	16 June 1685
Act in favours of S^{r} Peter Frazer of Doors of an imposition for upholding the bridge on the water of Dye.
Not public and general	1685 c. 63 —	16 June 1685
Act in favors of David Erskine of Dun of an imposition for upholding the Bridge of Northesk.
Not public and general	1685 c. 64 —	16 June 1685
Act in favors of the Town of Dalkeith for an imposition for upholding the tuo bridges thereof.
Not public and general	1685 c. 65 —	16 June 1685
Act in favors of the Town of Linlithgow for an imposition for upholding the bridge thereof.
Not public and general	1685 c. 66 —	16 June 1685
Act in favours of the Burgh of Inverness for an imposition at the bridge thereof.
Not public and general	1685 c. 67 —	16 June 1685
Act in favours of the Burgh of Aberdeen for an imposition at the Casay port of Aberdeen.
Not public and general	1685 c. 68 —	16 June 1685
Ratification in favours of George Duke of Gordon &c. of the Marquisat Earldom and Lordship of Huntlie.
Not public and general	1685 c. 69 —	16 June 1685
Ratification in favors of Charles Earle of Marr &c. of the Lands and Earldom of Marr.
Not public and general	1685 c. 70 —	16 June 1685
Ratification in favors of William Earle of Monteith of ane decreet of divorce before the Commissars and ane decreet before the Lords of Justiciary against Anna then designed Countess of Monteith.
Not public and general	1685 c. 71 —	16 June 1685
Ratification in favors of George Viscount of Tarbet of the lands & barony of Roystoun.
Not public and general	1685 c. 72 —	16 June 1685
Ratification in favours of George Viscount of Tarbat of the Lords of Session their decreit of sale of the lands & barony of Cromerty &c.
Not public and general	1685 c. 73 —	16 June 1685
Ratification in favours of George Viscount of Tarbat of ane Charter of Recognition of the town and lands of Lochsline &c.
Not public and general	1685 c. 74 —	16 June 1685
Ratification of the Charter of Erection of the Royall College of Physicians of Edinburgh and of the acts of the Privy Councill and Lords of Session in their favours.
Not public and general	1685 c. 75 —	16 June 1685
Ratification in favors of M^{r} Roderick M_{c}Kenzie of Prestounhall of the lands of Prestounhall.
Not public and general	1685 c. 76 —	16 June 1685
Ratification in favors of Robert Earle of Southesque of the muir of Montreuthmonth.
Not public and general	1685 c. 77 —	16 June 1685
Ratification in favors of Hugh Wallace of Inglistoun of the lands barony and regality of Inglistoun.
Not public and general	1685 c. 78 —	16 June 1685
Ratification in favors of Mr John Richardson and John Drummond of the gift of common clerkship of the Toun of Edinburgh.
Not public and general	1685 c. 79 —	16 June 1685
Ratification in favors of Eneas McLeod keeper of the Registers in Edinburgh of the Lands of Arboll &c.
Not public and general	1685 c. 80 —	16 June 1685
Ratification in favors of S^{r} Robert Lowrie of Maxweltoun of the lands of Dunraggan.
Not public and general	1685 c. 81 —	16 June 1685
Ratification in favours of Duncand Toschoch of the lands and barony of Monyvaird.
Not public and general	1685 c. 82 —	16 June 1685
Ratification in favours of Collonell James Douglas and Robert Bartan of the Lands of Camloddan and others.
Not public and general	1685 c. 83 —	16 June 1685
Ratification in favours of the Apothecarys of Edinburgh of ane decreet of declarator of the Lords of Session &c. of their rights and privileges.
Not public and general	1685 c. 84 —	16 June 1685
Ratification in favours of Christopher Irving Doctor of Medicine of ane Act of Privy Council.
Not public and general	1685 c. 85 —	16 June 1685
Ratification in favours of Collonell David Barclay of Ury and his Son of the Lands and Barony of Ury.
Not public and general	1685 c. 86 —	16 June 1685
Ratification in favours of the Trades of Edinburgh of ane Act of the Town Councill and Decreit of the Lords of Session.
Not public and general	1685 c. 87 —	16 June 1685
Ratification in favors of the Bonnetmakers and Litsters of Edinburgh of their Seal of Cause and Act of Parliament in their favours.
Not public and general	1685 c. 88 —	16 June 1685
Ratification in favors of the Burgh of Inverness of their rights and privileges.
Not public and general	1685 c. 89 —	16 June 1685
Ratification in favors of John Scott of Comistoun of the lands & barony of Comistoun.
Not public and general	1685 c. 90 —	16 June 1685
Ratification in favours of James Milne in Montrose of the lands of Ballwillow and Balneilly.
Not public and general	1685 c. 91 —	16 June 1685
Ratification in favours of M^{r} David Dewar of Muirtoun Advocat of the Lands of Muirtoun &c.
Not public and general	1685 c. 92 —	16 June 1685
Ratification in favours of Donald M^{c}Donald of Moydart Captain of the Clanranald of the lands and barony of Moydart &c.
Not public and general	1685 c. 93 —	16 June 1685
Ratification in favours of Sir William Bruce of Kinross of the Barony and Regality of Kinross &c.
Not public and general	1685 c. 94 —	16 June 1685
Ratification in favours of Sir John Murray of Drumcairn of the lands & barony of Binn.
Not public and general	1685 c. 95 —	16 June 1685
Ratification in favours of Alexander Irvine of Drum of the lands and barony of Drum &c.
Not public and general	1685 c. 96 —	16 June 1685
Ratification in favours of S_{r} George M^{c}Kenzie his Majesty's Advocat of his right to the lands and barrony of Newtyle &c.
Not public and general	1685 c. 97 —	16 June 1685
Ratification in favours of James Calder of Muirtoun of the barrony of Muirtoun.
Not public and general	1685 c. 98 —	16 June 1685
Ratification in favours of the Baxters of Edinburgh of their privileges & Seal of Cause.
Not public and general	1685 c. 99 —	16 June 1685
Ratification in favours of M^{r} David Graham Tutor of Gorthy of the office of conjunct Clerk to the Bills.
Not public and general	1685 c. 100 —	16 June 1685
Ratification of ane Act of Convention of the Burrowes in favours of the Town of Cromarty.
Not public and general	1685 c. 101 —	16 June 1685
Ratification in favours of M^{r} Roderick McKenzie of Dalvennan of the lands of Dalvennan &c.
Not public and general	1685 c. 102 —	16 June 1685
Ratification in favours of John Lauder of Fountainhall and Sir John Lauder Advocat his Son of the lands and barony of Fountainhall.
Not public and general	1685 c. 103 —	16 June 1685
Ratification in favours of John Gordon of Rothemay of the lands of Rothemay &c.
Not public and general	1685 c. 104 —	16 June 1685
Ratification in favours of John Hamilton of Barncluith.
Not public and general	1685 c. 105 —	16 June 1685
Warrand to William Duke of Queensberry for four yearly fairs and a weekly mercat at Ecclefechan.
Not public and general	1685 c. 106 —	16 June 1685
Warrand to the Duke of Hamilton for tuo yearly fairs and a weekly mercat at the Church of Shots.
Not public and general	1685 c. 107 —	16 June 1685
Warrand to John Earle of Erroll for tuo yearly fairs and a weekly mercat at the Meikle Town of Slains.
Not public and general	1685 c. 108 —	16 June 1685
Warrand to Colin Earle of Balcarras for tuo yearly fairs and a weekly mercat at the town of Colinsburgh.
Not public and general	1685 c. 109 —	16 June 1685
Warrand to Walter Lord Torphichen for three years and a weekly mercat at Calder and West Calder.
Not public and general	1685 c. 110 —	16 June 1685
Warrand to Sr Alexander Charden of that Ilk for four yearly fairs and a weekly mercat at the toun of Aplegirth.
Not public and general	1685 c. 111 —	16 June 1685
Warrand to the Burgh of Dingwall for tuo yearly fairs and a weekly mercat.
Not public and general	1685 c. 112 —	16 June 1685
Warrand to Alexander Innice of Cockstoun for three yearly fairs and a weekly mercat at Longbride.
Not public and general	1685 c. 113 —	16 June 1685
Warrand to James Caddell of Muirtoun for tuo yearly fairs and a weekly mercat at Blackstobs.
Not public and general	1685 c. 114 —	16 June 1685
Warrand to Mr Roderick McKenzie of Prestonhall for tuo yearly fairs and a weekly mercat at Prestounhall.
Not public and general	1685 c. 115 —	16 June 1685
Warrand to Hugh Lord Fraser of Lovat for ane yearly fair at the mure of Lovat and a weekly mercat at Bewly.
Not public and general	1685 c. 116 —	16 June 1685
Warrand to Alexr Udney of that Ilk for three yearly faires at the Kirktoun of Udney and a weekly mercat at the town of Newburgh.
Not public and general	1685 c. 117 —	16 June 1685
Warrand to Hugh Ross of Kilravock for tuo yearly fairs and a weekly mercat at Kilravock and Rorichies.
Not public and general	1685 c. 118 —	16 June 1685
Warrand to the Marques of Douglas for tuo yearly fairs and a weekly mercat at the town of Douglas.
Not public and general	1685 c. 119 —	16 June 1685
Warrand to M^{r} Roderick McKenzie of Dalvennan for tuo yearly faires and a weekly mercat at Dalvennan.
Saving the Rights Act 1685 Not public and general	1685 c. 120; 1685 c. 46	16 June 1685
Act Salvo jure Cujuslibet. Act Salvo jure Cujuslibet.
Adjournment Act 1685 (repealed)	1685 c. 121; 1685 c. 47	16 June 1685
Act of Adjournment. Act of Adjournment. (Repealed by Statute Law Revision (Scotland) Act 1906 (6 Edw. 7. c. 38))

=== Sources ===
- Alexander, William (1841). "Acta Parliamentorum Regis Jacobi Septimi". An Abridgement of the Acts of the Parliaments of Scotland. Edinburgh: Adam and Charles Black. pp. A71–A73 – via Google Books.
- Alexander, William (1841). "Acta Parliamentorum Regis Jacobi Septimi". An Abridgement of the Acts of the Parliaments of Scotland. Edinburgh: Adam and Charles Black. pp. A71–A73 – via Google Books.
- Chronological Table of the Statutes. London: Her Majesty's Stationery Office. 1972. pp. 1357–1358 – via Google Books.
- "Acts of the Old Scottish Parliament: 1685". legislation.gov.uk. The National Archives.
- "Index of Statutes: Index of Statutes: James VII (1685-1688)". Records of the Parliaments of Scotland to 1707. University of St Andrews.

== See also ==
- List of legislation in the United Kingdom
- Records of the Parliaments of Scotland
