= Thomas Bryan (judge) =

British justice

Sir Thomas Bryan KS KB (died 14 August 1500) was a British justice of obscure origin. It is suggested by J.H. Baker (Oxford Dictionary of National Biography) that he descended from a John Bryan, fishmonger of London, whose son, also John (d. 1418), owned land in Buckinghamshire & London, as did Sir Thomas.

Bryan assumed arms similar to those of Guy De Bryan when he became a person of some importance; but a direct descent is unlikely, as the male line of this family became extinct with the death of Sir William de Bryan of Seale in 1395, without issue.

He began his legal studies in the 1440s, becoming a student at Gray's Inn, progressing rapidly; by 1456 he was already a Bencher, and was acting as a Feoffee for the Inn. He was at this point serving as legal counsel for various London companies, including as a steward for St Bartholomew's Hospital in 1459.

He was appointed Common Serjeant of London in 1460, a position he held until he was created Serjeant-at-law in 1463, followed by a further promotion to King's Serjeant in 1470. After the accession of Edward IV in 1471 Bryan was made Chief Justice of the Common Pleas, and was appointed a Knight of the Bath in 1475. Bryan served as Chief Justice for 29 years until his death, the longest period of service up to that point.

He died on 14 August 1500, leaving a son, another Sir Thomas Bryan, whose son Francis Bryan became Lord Chief Justice of Ireland and was known as the "Vicar of Hell".

Legal offices
Preceded by Sir Robert Danby	Chief Justice of the Common Pleas; 1471–1500	Succeeded by Sir Thomas Wode
