= Base fee =

Interest in real property that has the potential to last forever

A base fee is an interest in real property that has the potential to last forever, provided a specified contingent event does not take place. For example, a grantee might be given an interest in a piece of land, "as long as the land is not used for any illegal purposes."

== Law ==
In law, a base fee is a freehold estate of inheritance which is limited or qualified by the existence of certain conditions. In modern property law the commonest example of a base fee is an estate created by a tenant in tail, not in possession, who bars the entail without the consent of the protector of the settlement. Any attempt to bar the entail without the consent of the Protector would only be partially successful. Though he bars his own issue (the rights of the future tenants in tail), he cannot bar any remainder or reversion, and the estate (i.e. the base fee) thus created is determinable on the failure of his issue in tail. The base fee can be defined as rights that would last for as long as the fee tail would have lasted, but which will end when the line of descent stipulated in the fee tail ran out.

An example of this kind of estate was introduced by George Eliot into the plot of Felix Holt, the Radical (1866), and also by Cyril Hare in He Should Have Died Hereafter (1957). In the latter work (also published as Untimely Death), the plot turns on the UK Limitation Act 1939 section 11, under which a base fee might be enlarged into a fee simple by the owner remaining in possession for 12 years.

Another example of a base fee is an estate descendible to heirs general, but terminable on an uncertain event; for example, a grant of land to A and his heirs, tenants of the manor of Dale. The estate terminates whenever the prescribed qualification ceases. An early meaning of base fee was an estate held not by free or military service, but by base service, i.e. at the will of the lord.

== See also ==
- Fee simple
