= Philipp Knipschildt =

Philipp Knipschildt (1595 – September 29, 1657) was a jurist and legal historian.

== Life ==
Philipp Knipschildt was born in Treisbach (Waldeck), the son of Melchior Knipschildt and Catharina née Lefart. From c. 1604 he attended school at Medebach in the Duchy of Westphalia; as a Protestant, he moved to Sachsenhausen in the Duchy of Waldeck in 1606. He spent several years in Wildungen and Korbach before enrolling at the Soest Archigymnasium. He attended the University of Giessen from 1615 to 1620 before serving as tutor to Prince Charles Ludwig of Pfalz-Veldenz until 1623. Subsequently, he studied at Strasbourg, obtaining his doctoral degree on November 4, 1626, with a study of fideicommissa. He became engaged to Elisabeth Kreidenmann from Esslingen that same year.

Now a doctor of both laws, Knipschildt served as legal advisor to the Swabian Circles of Neckar and Kocher, from 1641 onwards as Counsel to Esslingen, where he had taken citizenship in 1629. He died in Esslingen am Neckar.

His principal writings include a standard work on the early modern constitutional law of the Imperial cities (Tractatus politico-historico-juridicus de juribus et privilegiis civitatum imperialium, Ulm 1657), a large-scale study of the Imperial nobility (Tractatus politico-historico-juridicus de juribus et privilegiis nobilitatis, first published in 1693), and a massive manual on the law of fideicommissa (Tractatus de fideicommissis nobilium familiarum – von Stammgütern, Ulm 1654 - expanded from his dissertation) which remained a standard reference work until well into the 19th century.

== Bibliography ==
- Borst, Otto (1978). Geschichte der Stadt Esslingen am Neckar (3rd ed.). Esslingen. pp. 333–334. ISBN 3-7628-0378-1.
- Johann August Ritter von Eisenhart (1882). "Knipschild, Philipp". Allgemeine Deutsche Biographie (in German). Vol. 16. Leipzig: Duncker & Humblot. pp. 297–298.
- Schreiber, Fritz (1998). Philippus Knipschildt Medebachio Westphalus – Syndicus Esslingensis. Die Biographie eines bedeutenden Juristen (1595–1657). Medebach: Heimat- und Geschichtsverein Medebach.
