= De donis conditionalibus =

English feudal statute of 1285

Estates Tail Act 1285
- Act of Parliament
- Parliament of England
- Long title: De donis conditionalibus.
- Citation: 13 Edw. 1. c. 1
- Territorial extent: England and Wales; Ireland

Dates
- Royal assent: 1285 by Edward I of England
- Commencement: 1 April 1285 (Note: Start of session.)

Other legislation
- Amended by: Statute Law Revision Act 1887
- Relates to: Marriage (Same Sex Couples) Act 2013 (Consequential and Contrary Provisions and Scotland) Order 2014

Status: Amended

Text of statute as originally enacted

Revised text of statute as amended

Text of the The Statute of Westminster the Second (De Donis Conditionalibus) 1285 as in force today (including any amendments) within the United Kingdom, from legislation.gov.uk.

De donis conditionalibus or the Estates Tail Act 1285 is a chapter of the English Statutes of Westminster (1285). It originated the law of entail – forbidding a landholder to sell his land except to his heirs.

== Background ==
A form of entail has been known before the Norman feudal law had been domesticated in England. The common form was a grant "to the feoffee and the heirs of his body", by which limitation it was sought to prevent alienation from the lineage of the first purchaser. These grants were also known as feuda conditionata, because if the donee had no heirs of his body the estate reverted to the donor. This right of reversion was evaded by the interpretation that such a gift was a conditional fee, which enabled the donee, if he had an heir of the body born alive, to alienate the land, and consequently disinherit the issue and defeat the right of the donor. To remedy this the statute De donis conditionalibus was passed.

== Provisions ==
In 1285 the statute De donis conditionalibus enacted that in grants to a man and his heirs, the will of the donor as expressed in the grant should be followed. The donee should have no power to dispose of the land in any other way. After the donee's death, the land would be inherited by his heirs – or if he had no heirs, then by the donor or the donor's heirs.

Since the passing of the statute, an estate given to a man and the heirs of his body has been known as an estate tail, or an estate in fee tail (feudum talliatum). The word tail is derived from the French tailler, to cut, the inheritance being by the statute cut down and confined to the heirs of the body.

== Criticism ==
It is claimed that the operation of the statute produced innumerable evils: "children, it is said, grew disobedient when they knew they could not be set aside; farmers were deprived of their leases; creditors were defrauded of their debts; innumerable latent entails were produced to deprive purchasers of the land they had fairly bought; treasons also were encouraged, as estates tail were not liable to forfeiture longer than for the tenant's life".

On the other hand, by limiting inheritance to the eldest son, the other issue were forced to seek employment elsewhere, thus, it has been argued, preventing the growth of a landed caste. The professions of the church, the army and the law were constantly recruited from the younger sons of landed families, preventing the gap between nobility and the rest.

== Subsequent developments ==
The power of alienation was reintroduced by the judges in Taltarum's Case (Year Book, 12 Edward IV., 1472) by means of a fictitious suit or recovery which had originally been devised by the regular clergy for evading the statutes of Mortmain.

The act was extended to Ireland by Poynings' Law 1495 (10 Hen. 7. c. 22 (I)).

This was abolished by the Fines and Recoveries Act 1833 (3 & 4 Will. 4. c. 74), which provided an alternative means of barring entails.

== See also ==
- Quia Emptores
- History of English land law
