= Charles Palliser =

American-born and British-based novelist

Charles Palliser (born December 11, 1947, in Holyoke, Massachusetts) is an American-born and British-based novelist. His most well-known novel, The Quincunx, has sold over a million copies internationally. He is the elder brother of the late author and freelance journalist Marcus Palliser.

== Life and career ==
Born in New England, Palliser is an American citizen but has lived in the United Kingdom since the age of three. He went to Oxford in 1967 to read English Language and Literature and took a First in June 1970. He was awarded the BLitt in 1975 for a dissertation on Modernist fiction. From 1974 until 1990, Palliser was a lecturer in the Department of English at the University of Strathclyde in Glasgow. He was the first Deputy Editor of The Literary Review when it was founded in 1979. He taught creative writing during the Spring semester of 1986 at Rutgers University in New Jersey. In 1990, he gave up his university post to become a full-time writer when his first novel, The Quincunx, became an international best-seller. He teaches occasionally for the Arvon Foundation, the Skyros Institute, the University of London, London Metropolitan University, and Middlesex University. He was Writer in Residence at the University of Poitiers in 1997.

== Work ==
He has published six novels, which have been translated into a dozen languages; among them French, German, Dutch, Finnish, Spanish, Greek, Japanese, Lithuanian, Polish, and Russian. Palliser has also written for the theatre, radio, and television. His stage play, Week Nothing, toured Scotland in 1980. His 90-minute radio play, The Journal of Simon Owen, was commissioned by the BBC and twice broadcast on Radio 4 in June 1982. His short TV film, Obsessions: Writing, was broadcast by the BBC and published by BBC Publications in 1991. His short radio play, Artist with Designs, was broadcast on BBC Radio 3 on 21 February 2004.

Since 1990, he has written the Introduction to a Penguin Classics edition of the Sherlock Holmes stories; the foreword to a new French translation of Wilkie Collins’ The Moonstone, published by Éditions Phébus; and other articles on 19th century and contemporary fiction. He is a past member of the long-running North London Writers circle .

== Awards and nominations ==
In 1991, The Quincunx was awarded the Sue Kaufman Prize for First Fiction by the American Academy and Institute of Arts and Letters, which is given for the best first novel published in North America. The Unburied was nominated for the 2001 International International Dublin Literary Award.

== Novels ==
- The Quincunx: The Inheritance of John Huffam (Canongate 1989, and Ballantine 1990), ISBN 0-345-37113-5
- The Sensationist (Cape and Ballantine, 1991), ISBN 0-345-37935-7
- Betrayals (Cape and Ballantine, 1993)
- The Unburied (Phoenix House and Farrar, Straus & Giroux, 1999), ISBN 0-7434-1051-3
- Rustication (W. W. Norton & Company, 2013), ISBN 978-0-393-08872-4
- Sufferance (Guernica World Editions, 2024)
