= Common recovery =

Obsolete proceedings in English land law

A common recovery was a legal proceeding in England that enabled lawyers to convert an estate held in fee tail, which restricted ownership and other rights to specified direct descendants of the original owner, into fee simple ownership that lacked such restrictions. This was accomplished through the use of a series of collusive legal procedures, some parts of which were fictional and others unenforceable.

In the case of a sale, the process involved the use of an intermediary and another confederate cooperating with the owner and buyer in a court case. The owner of the land would begin by conveying it to an intermediary for the intended buyer's use. The buyer would then go to court against the intermediary, alleging that a non-existent person had instead taken possession of the land. Another confederate would vouch for the owner's continued possession of the land and would then disappear from court. This triggered a series of legal technicalities that caused the buyer to take ownership of the land; in return, the confederate who vouched for the land would be held theoretically responsible for providing, specifically, land of equal value back to the original owner, but this was always unenforceable as a confederate was chosen who owned no land. A similar sequence of events would be used for other transactions, such as a mortgage.

It was devised and perfected by lawyers in the second half of the fifteenth century. A 1472 case, known as Taltarum's Case, increased its popularity.

== Background ==
Entails were originally designed to keep ownership of parcels of land whole, and wholly owned within a family. Thanks to the effects of the statute De donis conditionalibus, the intent of the entail could not be broken. This meant that land in fee tail could not simply be sold, transferred, or mortgaged as—whatever the current owner did with it—ownership would automatically pass on their death to those specified by the entail. While entails performed a valuable function in the 13th century, when De donis conditionalibus was enacted, by the 15th century the courts had extended their scope so that they were now perpetual. Social and economic conditions meant that landowners were more concerned with being able to freely sell, convey or mortgage their land. In the second half of the 15th century common recovery was devised as a way of circumventing De donis conditionalibus.

== The process ==
The common recovery was intended to turn land held in fee tail into land held in fee simple, and exploited elements of existing legal procedures to achieve this.

Two factors were critical:

1. the institution of entail was created by explicit law which protected the future rights of heirs to the entailed estate. Courts did not have the power to break, even when doing so would produce the more fair outcome;
2. the law regarded land and money as completely separate — land was not recognized as having monetary value: if someone was deprived of land, legal redress could only be in the form of land.

=== Dramatis personæ ===
A: owner of entailed land, the vouchee

B: person to whom the entailed land is conveyed before the common recovery begins, the tenant in præcipe

C: intended new owner of the land in fee simple, the demandant

D: legal stooge who vouches to warranty and defaults, the common vouchee

HH: (fictitious) person whom C claims has occupied the land, usually goes by the name Hugh (or Humphrey) Hunt, the disseisor

=== Preliminaries ===
A owned entailed land. He wanted to pass it to C for C's use in perpetuity. C could either be a trustee of the estate (if the aim was simply to break the entail) or the purchaser (if the land was being sold). Because of point 1, no contract or legal action between A and C could achieve this. A third party, B, needed to be inserted between A and C. B was usually a lawyer acting for A and all the parties to the ensuing legal actions colluded to achieve the underlying aim.

A conveyed the entailed land to B with an instruction as to how the land was to be used. This might be:

- to the use of A and his heirs (i.e. in fee simple)
- (if the transaction was in connection with a sale) to the use of C (in fee simple)
- (if the transaction was in connection with a mortgage) to the use of C provided that if A paid off the principal and interest then it should revert to A and his heirs.
- If the aim was to enable the land to be resettled (on marriage or otherwise), it might be provided that a father and son could jointly appoint the property as they wished, or there might be detailed provisions as to the future interests in the land.

=== Proceedings in court ===
C now issued a writ against B, saying he had been unjustly dispossessed of the land by HH. B defended his right to the land, saying (correctly) that he had acquired it from A. A was called upon to vouch to warranty for the land. This meant that A was being asked to provide a legal guarantee of B's possession of the land. He did so, thereby laying himself open to providing redress if his warranty proved defective. A is often referred to as the vouchee because the court vouches him (i.e. asks him to appear) to warranty for the land.

A appeared in court and called D to warrant ownership of the land. D appeared in court, disputed HH's occupation of the land and "put himself on the country", i.e. agreed to accept the court's judgment. By so doing, he took from A the legal liability to provide redress if his warranty proved defective.

C, who was also in court, now asked for an adjournment to imparl with the other parties, in order to seek an amicable settlement. If it was granted, C subsequently appeared but D did not. If the adjournment wasn't granted, D dashed out of the court.

=== Judgment ===
D was held to be in contempt of court and so had defaulted on his warranty. This led to the judgment that C should recover the land and that D should compensate B with land of equal value (see point 2).

Importantly, the judgment that C should recover the land was given as a final judgment. This barred any further litigation on the matter. If A had defaulted without bringing D into the case, the judgment would have been a common judgment against him. This would have allowed A's heirs to litigate against C or to reclaim the land after A's death (see point 1).

The other part of the judgment (which was given as a common judgment) was that D should compensate B with land of equal value. But D, although he might have money, had no land. So that part of the judgment was not enforced. There was nothing which B could gain (if he chose to renege on his part in the collusion) in pursuing D for land which he did not possess. Nor, for that matter, could the heirs to A's entail get the land from D, although they too had the right to sue him for it. Indeed, it was this theoretical right which enabled the judges to make the judgment against B final (rather than common), as it meant that the interests of all the parties, including the heirs to the entail, were protected.

=== Result ===
The result was that C recovered the land from B in fee simple despite A's having owned it only in fee tail. Being held in fee simple, the land could now be freely sold or transferred or a new settlement made, thus defeating De donis conditionalibus.

Occasionally, it was also necessary to bar the rights of other persons E, such as trustees holding in trust for an equitable tenant in tail; in that case A alleged that he had acquired it from E and E alleged it had come from D, but the final result was the same.

=== Remarks ===
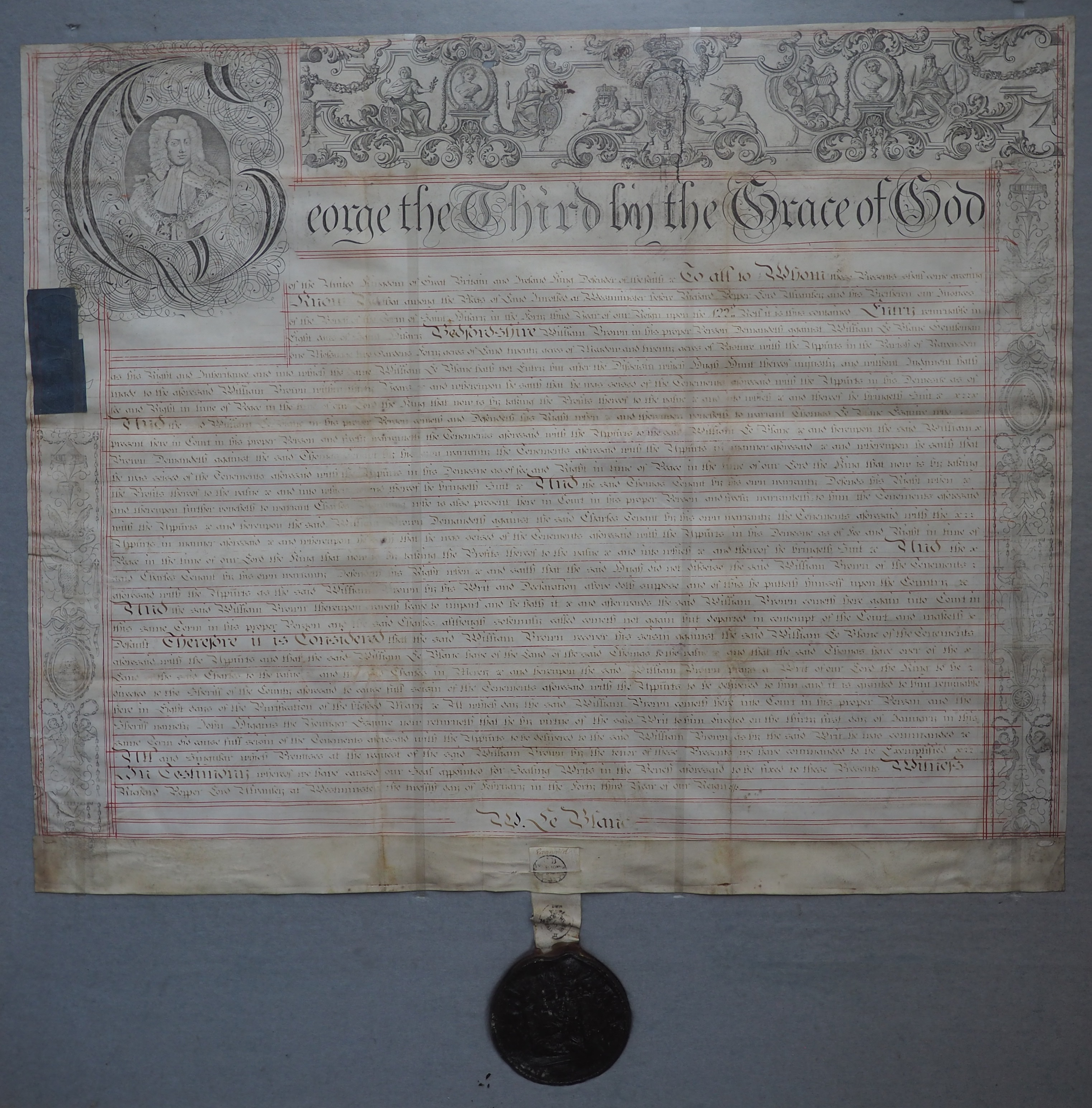
Exemplification of Common Recovery by William Brown of Ravensden, Bedfordshire at Court of Common Pleas, Westminster,1803

At the end of the proceeding, the lawyers often had an exemplification of the proceedings prepared; this was a formal transcript of the proceedings in the monarch's name and sealed with a large seal, often mounted (to preserve it) in a tin box. Unless there was a whole manor or an advowson involved, the description of the land (which may be exaggerated) merely stated the improvements: number of houses etc.; extent: acres of land; type: meadow, pasture etc.; and the location: township or parish where it was. These descriptions are thus usually not particularly useful as historical sources. Since the purpose of the transaction cannot be known from the recovery, it is possible to say only that the vouchee dealt with the land.

In the earliest recoveries, different people took the role of D. Some of the defaults may have occurred naturally, e.g. by death or incapacity of the warrantor to attend court. But from 1470 a single person, Robert King acted in most recoveries. The defaults were being manufactured routinely. Robert King was succeeded in the 1480s by Dennis Guyer, who established a monopoly. He became known as the common vouchee and the legal process as common recovery. In this context common means "belonging to the community", i.e. everyone who wanted to bring an entail to an end could pay Dennis Guyer four pence to be their vouchee. In later centuries the common vouchee was often the court crier and could appear under a fictitious name.

== Abolition ==
In England and Wales, common recoveries were abolished in 1833; instead a disentailing deed (a successor to that creating the tenant in præcipe) was enrolled in Chancery. Since 1926, entails can no longer exist as legal estates, only as equitable interests, and enrollment has become unnecessary.

Like fines (or final concords), common recoveries were proceedings based upon a legal fiction in order to produce a genuine change, but without truly adverse parties. In this they differ from the use of a legal fiction in ejectment cases, where there was a genuine dispute, but one that required a legal fiction to make it justiciable.

== Archive examples ==
Legal documentation of the common recovery of a manor in East Sussex in 1633 is held at the Cadbury Research Library, University of Birmingham.
