= Richard Willoughby =

Richard Willoughby may refer to

- Richard Willoughby (judge) (died 1325), Chief Justice of the Common Pleas for Ireland
- Richard de Willoughby (c. 1290–1362), Lord Chief Justice of England
- Richard Verney, 13th Baron Willoughby de Broke (1693–1752), English peer
- Richard Verney, 19th Baron Willoughby de Broke (1869–1923), English peer
