= William Scott (justice) =

English lawyer and justice

Sir William Scott

28th Lord Chief Justice of England
- In office 8 January 1341 – 26 November 1346
- Monarch: Edward III
- Prime Minister: Henry, 3rd Earl of Lancaster (1341–1345); Henry of Grosmont, 1st Duke of Lancaster (1345–1346) (as Lord High Stewards)
- Chancellor: Robert Parning (1341–1343); Robert Sadington (1343–1345); John de Ufford (1345–1346)
- Preceded by: Robert Parning
- Succeeded by: William de Thorpe

Sir William Scott (d. 1350s) was an English lawyer, and Chief Justice of the King's Bench from 8 January 1341 to 26 November 1346. Originally from Yorkshire – probably Birthwaite in Kexbrough – Scott as Chief Justice presided over trials resulting from Edward III's purge of the administration the previous years. Among those tried was William de la Pole. After retiring from this position, Scott largely withdrew from public life, probably because of ill health. He returned to Yorkshire to attend to his estates. The Oxford Dictionary of National Biography says that he "was still alive on 10 March 1352...but was certainly dead by 11 May 1356, and probably by 1354".

== Sources ==
- Summerson, Henry. "Scott, Sir William (d. 1352x6)". Oxford Dictionary of National Biography (online ed.). Oxford University Press. doi:10.1093/ref:odnb/24930. (Subscription, Wikipedia Library access or UK public library membership required.)

Legal offices
Preceded by Robert Parning	Lord Chief Justice; 1341–1346	Succeeded by William de Thorpe
