= David Brooke =

David Brooke may refer to:

- David Brooke-Taylor (1920–2000), English cricketer
- David Brooke (politician) (c. 1498–1560), Lord Chief Baron of the Exchequer
- Sir David Brooke, 11th Baronet (1938–2012), of the Brooke baronets

== See also ==
- David Brook (disambiguation)
- David Brooks (disambiguation)
- Brooke (surname)
