= Clement Higham =

English politician and lawyer (died 1571)

The Right Honourable Sir Clement Higham MP JP PC
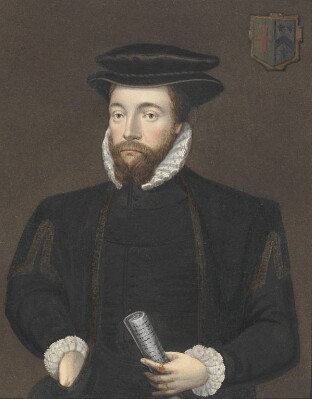

Lord Chief Baron of the Exchequer
- In office 1558–1559
- Preceded by: David Broke
- Succeeded by: Edward Saunders

Speaker of the House of Commons
- In office 12 November 1554 – 16 January 1555
- Monarch: Mary I
- Preceded by: Robert Broke
- Succeeded by: John Pollard

Personal details
- Born: c. 1495
- Died: 9 March 1571 Barrow, Suffolk
- Spouse(s): (1) Anne Moonines; (2) Anne Waldegrave (1506–1590)
- Parent(s): Clement Heigham; Maud Cooke
- Education: Lincoln's Inn

Sir Clement Higham MP JP PC (also Heigham; before 1495 – 9 March 1571) of Barrow, Suffolk, was an English lawyer and politician, a Speaker of the House of Commons in 1554, and Chief Baron of the Exchequer in 1558–1559. A loyal Roman Catholic, he held various offices and commissions under Queen Mary I, and was knighted in 1555 by King Philip, but withdrew from politics after the succession of Queen Elizabeth I in 1558.

== Background and early career ==
Clement Heigham was the son and heir of Clement Heigham of Lavenham, Suffolk, the fourth son of Thomas Heigham of Heigham (died 1492). His mother was Matilda (Maud), daughter of Lawrence Cooke of Lavenham. His exact birth date is not known, but (if we follow Metcalfe's edition) he was the first of five sons, also Thomas, John, William and Edmond. His father died on 29 August 1500, and was buried under a marble slab in the Braunches chapel on the north side of the chancel of Lavenham church, with a brass figure in full armour, a brief Latin inscription, and above it a single shield for Heigham displaying Sable a fess componée or and azure, between 3 horses' heads erased argent. (The brasses are long since lost.)

It is suggested that Clement may have received early education from the monks of Bury St Edmunds. He was admitted at Lincoln's Inn in July 1517, but, being appointed an officer for the Inn's celebration of Christmas in 1519, failed to turn up, and was fined. He was called to the bar in 1525. In around 1520 he married Anne Monnynge, of a mid-Suffolk family, and over the next years she had five daughters, and one son (who died in infancy). In 1521 Clement Heigham, Roger Reve (brother of John Reve, Abbot of Bury St Edmunds 1513–1539) and Thomas Munning were among the feoffees for 2nd Duke of Norfolk and others in lands at Stow Bardolph and Wimbotsham, Norfolk.

By 1528, however, his first wife was dead, and he remarried to the widow Anne Bures, daughter of George Waldegrave of Smallbridge, Suffolk and Anne Drury, with whom he had a further three sons and two daughters. Anne had previously been the wife of Sir Henry Bures (died 1528), of Acton Hall, Suffolk, and by him had four daughters, Joan, Bridget, Anne and another, who were small children at the time of the second marriage. They were therefore the step-sisters of Heigham's elder daughters, and of similar ages to them, and were to become the half-sisters of the Heigham children by the second marriage. Estimates of the birthdate of John Higham, his first son by Anne, range between c. 1530 and c. 1540.

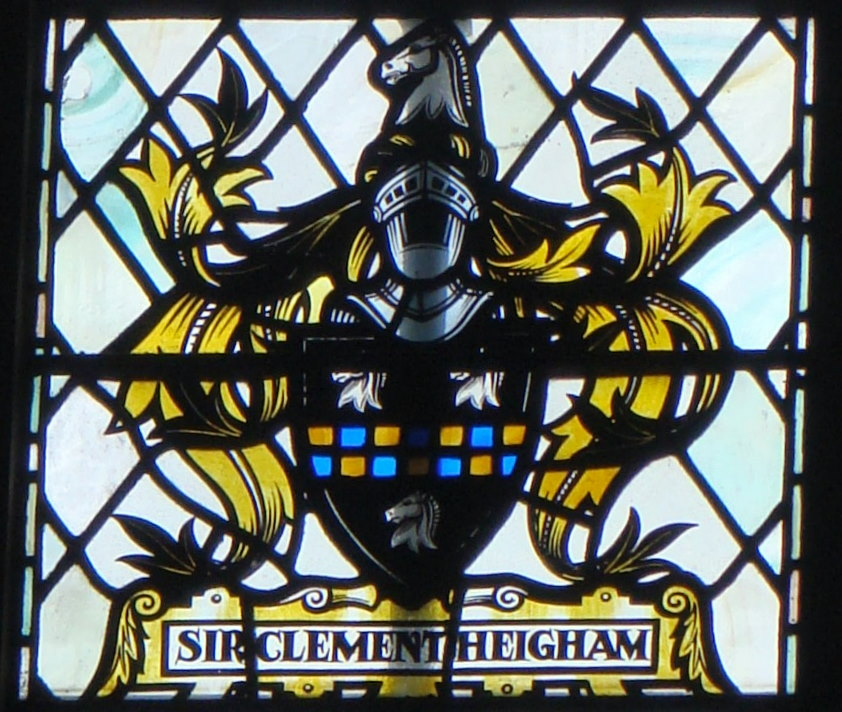
Heigham's coat of arms, at Lincoln's Inn

His attainments as a lawyer, and perhaps the example of the Abbot's bailiff Thomas Heigham during the 1470s, had by 1528 recommended Clement Heigham to the office of Bailiff to the Abbey of Bury St Edmunds. In 1529 he first received commission as justice of the peace for Suffolk, and remained in the Suffolk magistracy for the rest of his life. He became Pensioner at Lincoln's Inn in 1531 and was called to the Bench in 1534. On the east side of the county of Suffolk, farm of the site of the manor of Semer was leased to him in 1532 under the Convent seal for 30 years. On the west side he developed tenures around the Abbey's manor and park of Chevington, not far from Gazeley and the hamlet of Heigham from which his family took its name. In his chambers at Lincoln's Inn Heigham was presented as Autumn Reader in 1537/38 (when he was also appointed Marshall, but fined £7 for not acting), and Keeper of the Black Book in 1538/39. Through this time the monastic closures occurred, and Bury Abbey was dissolved in 1539.

== Dissolution and Edwardian period ==
Following the death in 1539 of Roger Reve, the Court of Augmentations instructed Clement Heigham of Chevington to pay £220 to Abbot John Reve (Roger's executor), and in March 1540, shortly before his death, John Reve made his own testament appointing Heigham his executor and disposing of the sum in many small legacies, not forgetting his sister Elizabeth Munning and her daughter. Reve gave to Heigham his valuable hangings in his great chamber at Horningsheath, and to Anne Heigham his best ring set with turkey stones. The manor and park of Chevington were among those granted to Sir Thomas Kytson in March 1540.

Serving as Treasurer of Lincoln's Inn in 1540–41, in December 1540 Heigham completed the purchase of the manor of Barrow, near Chevington, from Sir Thomas Wentworth (died 1551) of Nettlestead, by deed of Sir William Waldegrave of Smallbridge Hall (Anne Heigham's brother), Sir William Drury of Hawstead (her uncle) and Sir Thomas Jermyn of Rushbrooke Hall (her stepfather). Here he built his residence of Barrow Hall, which remained in the family of his descendants for more than two centuries. An illustration of the Hall, copied in 1779 from a 1597 original, survives. John Gage wrote of it, "Barrow Hall... stood on the south side of the church, and was a large brick building, moated. In the summer of 1775, the ground plan of the building was traceable. It was evident that the front had been broken by a central gatehouse, and several bay windows." The rectory of Barrow was then newly occupied as the benefice of a notable academic in the University of Cambridge, Dr Thomas Bacon, presented by the King in 1539. Heigham purchased the manor of Semer from the King for £426 in 1543.

Queen Katheryn's letter from Hampton Court of 25 July 1544 to the King in Calais, advising His Majesty that Clement Higham had been appointed by the Council and the High Treasurer of the Wars for the wafting of £40,000 unto His Majesty on the following Monday, indicates the high level of trust now reposed in him. He was again appointed Autumn Reader at Lincoln's Inn at All Souls 1545, but he was reported to be "sykke and disseased", and Giles Townsend had to read for him. The Solicitor-General (Edward Griffith) called an immediate council which appointed Heigham Lent Reader next coming if willing, or to pay a fine of 20 nobles, and wrote at once for his decision. He read at Lent 1547/48. Following the death of King Henry and the accession of Edward VI in 1547, the Autumn vacation of 1548 was not kept owing to a death from plague in the Inn, but at the Council at All Saints' Day 1548 Clement Heigham first sat as a Governor of Lincoln's Inn, and regularly thereafter through the reigns of Edward and of Mary, where he was often in company with Edward Griffith.

During the 1540s Anne Heigham's daughters were married: three of them were married to three brothers, the sons and coheirs of the royal physician William Butts (1486–1545) and his wife Margaret, heiress of the Cambridgeshire family of Bacon. Joan Bures married (Sir) William Butts the younger, lord of Thornage, Norfolk, who died in 1583; Bridget Bures married Thomas Butts, lord of Ryburgh Magna, Norfolk, who took part in the 1536 voyage of Richard Hore to Newfoundland; and Anne married Edmund Butts, of Barrow, Suffolk in 1547, and had a daughter Anne Butts. The fourth daughter, Mary, married Thomas Barrow of Shipdham, Norfolk, and was mother of the separatist, Henry Barrowe.

Abbot John had, until the dissolution of St Edmund's, been responsible for the collecting of the tenths in the diocese of Norwich (which Bishop Reppes had not blushed to spend), and in Edward's reign Heigham was still being held accountable for £972 outstanding so on the abbot's account. However, after an Act was introduced in 1549 to regulate and restore monastic pensions, in September 1552 Heigham was appointed a commissioner, together with Sir William Drury, Sir Thomas Jermyn (deceased), Sir William Waldegrave and others, to investigate abuses. They interviewed the late priors of Woodbridge and Eye, the abbot of Leiston and the prioress of Redlingfield, the Master and three fellows of Wingfield College, and many priests, former monks and lay annuitants. It was found that Ambrose Jermyn (son of Sir Thomas) had accepted the transfer of an annuity as an inducement for the granting of a benefice; Edward Reve had sold his annuity to John Holt, one of the commissioners. Heigham was given two geldings and named an executor in the will of Sir Thomas Jermyn, written September, proved December 1552.

== Marian advancement ==
In the succession crisis of the following summer, on 8 July 1553 Queen Mary wrote to Sir George Somerset, Sir William Drury, Sir William Waldegrave and Clement Heigham, informing them of the death of King Edward and commanding them to repair to her at Kenninghall in Norfolk. They, together with the Earl of Bath, Sir John Sulyard, Sir Henry Bedingfield, Henry Jerningham and others were with her on 12 July, in preparation for her journey to London: their swift loyalty to her was afterwards remembered. Bedingfield and Drury had sat in March for the county of Suffolk; but it was in the parliament of October 1553 that Heigham sat first, initially for Rye, and was placed in charge of some important legislation, including an Act to avoid unlawful risings. Wyatt's rebellion intervened in February 1554. In April 1554 Heigham was returned to parliament for Ipswich, Suffolk, and had responsibility for the bill concerning Ordinances for Cathedral churches in late April. This parliament was dissolved in May 1554, and soon afterwards he was admitted to the Privy Council of England.

=== Speaker of the House of Commons ===
It was then in November 1554, following solemnization of the marriage of Philip and Mary, that, being returned for West Looe (Cornwall), Heigham was elected Speaker of the House of Commons. The Bishop of Winchester, Lord Chancellor, opened the proceedings by declaring that the parliament was called for the confirmation of true (i.e. Catholic) religion. Then Heigham, being chosen Speaker, "in an excellent oration, comparing the body politic to the body natural, introduced the three usual petitions, for freedom of speech, etc., and was accepted." He presided over very weighty affairs. Cardinal Pole, his attainder reversed, spoke before both houses. The schemes of Stephen Gardiner were accomplished: the Acts against the Pope were repealed, and those against Heresy revived. Almost forty members of the Commons rose and left the house when they saw that the majority were minded to capitulate: Heigham's colleague Edward Griffith, since May 1552 Attorney-General, was ordered to indict them.

The parliament was dissolved on 16 January 1555, and shortly afterwards, 27 January, Heigham was knighted by King Philip in his chamber, together with the Lord Mayor of 1554-1555 John Lyon, Robert Broke (Lord Chief Justice of the Common Pleas), Edward Saunders, John Whiddon and William Staunford, Justices. In a legal notice issued in July 1555, in which he legitimizes the heir of a priest of Mildenhall who had married in the time of King Edward, it is expressed that Philip and Mary "per Clementum Heigham militem Senescallum suum concesserunt...", Senescallus or steward presumably referring to his position in the Privy Council. At Lincoln's Inn, at the All Saints' Day Council of 1554, Mr. Hygham's name appeared second in precedence among the six Governors, between Edward Griffith, Attorney-General of the King and Queen, and William Cordell, Solicitor-General: one year later, Clement Hygham, Knight, headed the list. Sir William Waldegrave died during that year, leaving £20 among the children of his sister Anne wife of Clement Higham.

== Heretics ==
According to Heigham's own epitaph,

"In punishment unto the pore which ded their cryme lament
He wold with pyty mercyfull from rigour soone relent:
But unto them which wilfully contynude in offence,
A terro[r] unto them he was in Justice true defence."

Advancement to the summit of his career depended, for Heigham, upon the favour of Mary and her Chancellor, which came with expectations. Inevitably he was an instrument of their persecutions, and as a justice and magistrate he must frequently have given the first hearings to cases of religious delinquency. His reputation for severity towards common people as heretics seems borne out by a few stories in John Foxe's Acts and Monuments.

Hooper and Mountain

He was plunged directly into the full political force of Gardiner's intentions within hours of receiving his knighthood. On 28 and 29 January 1554/55 Heigham was in St Mary Overie where Stephen Gardiner with Edmund Bonner presided over a solemn company of the bishops, many lords, knights and others, to witness the public inquisition and excommunication of John Hooper, Bishop of Gloucester. Hooper was condemned, sentenced and handed over to the Sheriffs of London for burning. Many, including Sir Clement Heigham and Sir Richard Dobbs, were required to witness the notarial certificate of the proceedings. John Rogers (Prebendary of St Paul's), Dr. Rowland Taylor and Laurence Saunders (brother of Sir Edward) were condemned in the same session: Hooper was burned on 9 February 1554/55. On 5 March 1555, Queen Mary rewarded Heigham for his loyalty to her at Framlingham, and for his services as Speaker, by the grant in chief of the reversion of the manor and rectory of Nedging, Suffolk, with its lands in Semer, Bildeston, Whatfield and Chelsworth.

Heigham was also on the Cambridge Castle Bench with Sir Robert Broke, Edward Griffith and others when Thomas Mountain, the troubled minister of Whittington College was brought into the August sessions of 1555, after a long imprisonment, and was found to have no accusers. The County Sheriff for November 1554 to 1555, Sir Oliver Leader, spoke up for Mountain, and then said he had forgotten to bring with him the writ against the man. Griffith, in the meantime, was telling Mountain that he was a traitor and a heretic, and likely to be hanged. However without a writ or an accuser Broke and his fellow-justices were obliged in all equity to release Mountain on bail, which was immediately put up by his acquaintances, and he was later able to make an escape.

East Anglian martyrs

In Ipswich in summer 1555 Robert Samuel, a minister of East Bergholt, was imprisoned, and burnt at the stake on 31 August. During his confinement two devout women of reformist views, Agnes Potten and Joan Trunchfield, visited Samuel and gave him encouragement. Immediately after his execution they were arrested and imprisoned, and the accounts of the Chamberlains of Ipswich show that Sergeant Holmes made two journeys to the home of Sir Clement Heigham in that connection before they were burned in a single fire at Ipswich on 19 February 1555/56.

At about this time information had been given against Robert Pygot, a painter from Wisbech, for non-attendance at church. He was called into the sessions, and Heigham said to him, "Ah, are you the holy father the painter? How chance you came not to the church?": to which Pygot answered, "Sir, I am not out of the church; I trust in God." "No, sir", said Heigham, "this is no church: this is a hall." "Yea, sir", said Pygot, "I know very well it is a hall: but he that is in the true faith of Jesus Christ, is never absent, but present in the church of God." "Ah sirrah", said the judge, "you are too high for me to talk with, wherefore I will send you to them that are better learned than I." So he was taken to jail in Ely and interrogated, and was burned there on 16 October 1555.

Heigham was present at the examination of John Fortune alias Cutler, a blacksmith of Hintlesham who had influenced Roger Bernard (a man burned at Bury St Edmunds on 30 June 1556). The Bishop of Norwich interviewed him, and Heigham intervened at a critical point in the dialogue. The bishop told Fortune he should be burned like a heretic, and Fortune asked "who shall give judgement upon me?" The bishop said, "I will judge a hundred such as thou art", and Fortune asked again, "Is there not a law for the spiritualty as well as for the temporalty?" Sir Clement Heigham said, "Yes, what meanest thou by that?" Fortune told the bishop he was a perjured man, because he had taken an oath to resist the Pope, in King Henry's time: and therefore, like a perjured lawyer, he should not be allowed to sit in judgement. 'Then sayde maister Hygham: "it is tyme to weede out suche fellowes as you bee in deede".' (This is from Fortune's own account.) Fortune was condemned.

Foxe also mentions John Cooper of Wattisham, who was arraigned at a Bury Lent Assize in 1557 before Sir Clement Heigham for allegedly having said that he should pray "if God would not take away Queen Mary, that then the devil would take her away." This accusation, for a treasonable saying, was made by one Fenning, who is thought to have borne false witness: Cooper denied it. Heigham told Cooper "he should not escape, for an example to all heretics", and sentenced him to be hanged, drawn and quartered, which was accordingly done.

In July 1558 the outspoken country wife Alice Driver of Grundisburgh, near Woodbridge, who had been pursued for her Protestant views into hiding in the countryside, appeared before Sir Clement at the Bury Assizes. Before him her principal offence was to compare Queen Mary to Jezebel, and to call her by that name, for which Heigham then and there commanded that her ears be cut off, which was done. He then committed her to be interrogated by Dr Spenser, Chancellor of Norwich, at Ipswich, where her spirited defence led to her condemnation and death at the stake in November 1558. It is said that he issued a writ for the burning of three men at Bury St Edmunds about a fortnight before the death of Queen Mary, when it was already known that she was beyond hope of recovery.

Chief Baron of the Exchequer

In the parliament beginning 20 January 1557/58, in which William Cordell was chosen Speaker, Sir Clement Heigham sat for Lancaster. When the session rose on 7 March, Heigham had a few days earlier (2 March) received appointment "during good behaviour" to be Chief Baron of the Exchequer (though he had never held the rank of Serjeant-at-law), in succession to Sir Robert Broke. The great matter then in preparation was the indictment against John Harleston (Captain of Ruysbank Castle), Edward Grymeston (Comptroller of Calais), Sir Ralph Chamberlain (Lieutenant of Calais Castle), Nicholas Alexander (Captain of Newenham Bridge Castle) and Thomas Lord Wentworth (Deputy of Calais), that they had become adherents of the King of the French and had treasonably conspired to deprive Her Majesty of Calais and the other castles and to surrender them to the French during the preceding January. The indictment was found before Thomas Curtis (lord mayor), Sir John Baker (Chancellor of the Exchequer), Sir Clement Heigham and Sir Robert Broke on 2 July 1558. The Queen ordered Heigham and Sir John Sulyard to take inventories of the goods of the accused, and an account of their revenues since the loss of Calais, on 15 July 1558.

== Elizabethan years ==
Heigham received a new patent as Chief Baron of the Exchequer upon the accession of Queen Elizabeth, but he resigned it on 22 January 1559, and so served only 10 months in the office in all, making way for Sir Edward Saunders to succeed him. The reversal of Mary's religious policy and the abhorrence of her persecutions was such that he withdrew from public office, and retired to Barrow Hall. He last appeared as Governor at the All Saints' Day 1557 Council of Lincoln's Inn, when his son-in-law Robert Kempe was Keeper of the Black Book. In November 1559 he was granted the arrears of an annuity relating to the wardship of his daughter Elizabeth Kempe's first marriage, to Henry Eden. His son and heir John Heigham, who had matriculated from Trinity Hall, Cambridge in 1555, was admitted to Lincoln's Inn on 7 May 1558. Sir Clement however retained his place in the Suffolk magistracy, and is said, in his epitaph, to have been beloved by his neighbours for his effectiveness in settling their disputes peaceably. On 22 June 1559, following the death of Dr Thomas Bacon (Master of Gonville Hall, Cambridge), incumbent, he presented John Crosyer, Cambridge B.A. (1535–1536), M.A. (1538), to the Rectory of Barrow.

Heigham retained until his death the office of Chief Bailiff to the town of Bury St Edmunds, as he had held it since the time of Sir Robert Drury. He drew support from his long connection with Sir Nicholas Bacon, appointed Lord Keeper of the Great Seal and Lord Privy Seal to Elizabeth in 1558, who in the 1560s was building his residences at Old Gorhambury, Hertfordshire and Redgrave Hall, Suffolk. During the 1540s Heigham was connected with Bacon in the manors of Ingham, Ampton and Culford. In 1562 Bacon was recruited by Heigham, Ambrose Jermyn, John Holt and others, to assist in their attempts to obtain a charter for Bury St Edmunds. He wrote supportively, but expressing doubt as to the prospects of success.

John Heigham, the heir, married in 1562. It was in 1564 that Sir Nicholas Bacon's son and heir, Nicholas Bacon the younger, married Anne Butts, Dame Anne Heigham's granddaughter. Sir Thomas Kytson the younger (1540–1603), of Hengrave Hall, described to the Duke of Norfolk how he accompanied Sir Clement Heigham and other gentlemen of the county to meet the Lord Keeper between Bury and Newmarket, in his progress to Redgrave Hall. In August 1566 Sir Thomas Gresham wrote from Ringshall to William Cecil telling how he had met the Lord Keeper at Sir Clement Heigham's house, where "his Lordshipe sealed the Quene's Maiestie's bonds" before proceeding to St Albans. A letter of 1569 survives in which the Lord Keeper instructs his son to send a brace of bucks from Redgrave to Sir Clement Heigham. When Heigham died in 1571, the office of Bailiff of Bury St Edmunds was granted to Nicholas Bacon "as fully as it was formerly held by Robert Drury, Kt., or Clement Heigham, Kt."

John Crosyer, rector of Barrow, died in December 1569 leaving a charitable request to the poor of the village and to its church, arising from the rents of 13 acres of land in Bury St Edmunds. He was buried in front of the altar at Barrow under a stone with his effigy in brass, and a long English verse inscription referring (in the third person) to his education, his teaching, his example and his benefaction. There were also short inscribed scrolls, and six lines of prayer in Latin verse (in the first person), which have now gone. Then on 28 May 1570 Sir Clement presented as rector another University of Cambridge academic, Dr Humphrey Busby, who had been (the second) Regius Professor of Civil Law in Cambridge from c. 1545 to c. 1550. He was apparently deputy as Vice-Chancellor to Walter Haddon (1549–50). Like Crosyer he was originally of Trinity Hall: in 1557-1558 he served at St Stephen Walbrook, but during the 1560s he was, as Dr Bacon had been, a member of Gonville Hall, and he established scholarships at both colleges. In 1573 Gabriel Harvey considered Busby to be senile, disputative, and over-fond of "seavenoclocke dinnars".

Heigham made his will on 10 November 1570. It opens with a lengthy prayer of repentance for his many sins, hoping for and trusting in forgiveness, so that he may have Grace to receive the body and blood in the form of bread, "the whiche after the consecracion thereof I steadfastly belive to be the verie bodie and bludd of our Saviour Jhu Christe, the whiche was crucified for me uppon the Crosse for the redempcon of me and all sinners", etc., thus professing his continued adherence to the mysteries of the Old English Religion. Naturally he could not make arrangements for a chantry, but he made numerous bequests to the poor people dwelling on his estates. The will, making his widow Anne and son John his executors, amply describes the family relationships, settling Barrow with all its appurtenances and other lands upon his widow Anne for life: they are to remain thereafter to his son John, who in his own right is to have the manor of Semer, or in default of issue it is to pass by entail through Sir Clement's heirs, all of whom are in other ways provided for. Sir Clement died on 9 March 1571 and was buried as he requested at Barrow, in the tomb described below. His son John received licence to enter upon his father's lands on 2 June 1571.

== Marriage and children ==
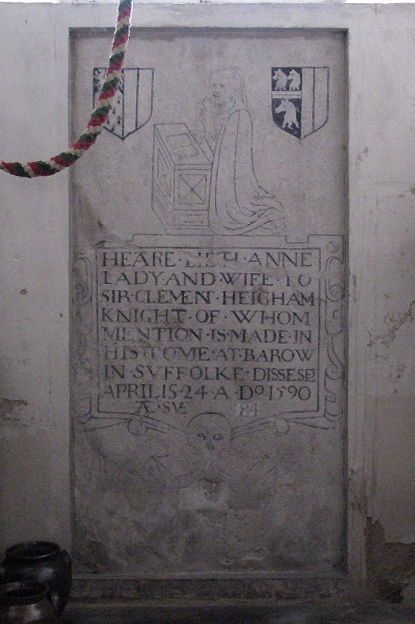
Memorial to Anne Heigham, Clement's second wife, at Thornage. She also appears on the brass at Barrow. (Photo by Evelyn Simak)

Sir Clement married twice.

His first wife, Anne, is in some sources said to have been Anne Moonines daughter of John de Moonines of Semer Hall, near Bildeston, Suffolk, but in others to have been the daughter of Thomas Monnynge or Munninge of Bury St Edmunds. By her Sir Clement had one son, who died without issue, and five daughters:

- Vincent Heigham (died in infancy).
- Elizabeth Heigham, living 1570, married (1) Henry Eden of St Edmundsbury, and (2) Robert Kempe of Finchingfield, Essex.
- Margaret Heigham, living 1570, married Humphrey Moseley, of Tunstall, Staffordshire; died 1606 aged 78, buried at Wolverhampton.
- Anne Heigham, living 1570, married Thomas Turner of Wratting, Suffolk.
- Frances Heigham, living 1570, married ----- Warren.
- Lucy Heigham, living 1570, married (1) John Bokenham, of Snetterton, Norfolk, and (2) Francis Stonar, of Stapleford, Essex.

His second wife, whom he married after 1528, was Anne Waldegrave (1506–1590), widow of Sir Henry Bures of Acton, Suffolk, and daughter of Sir George Waldegrave (1483–1528) of Smallbridge in the parish of Bures St. Mary, Suffolk and his wife Anne Drury (d. 1572). (Anne Drury was a daughter of Sir Robert Drury, Lord of the manors of Thurston and Hawstead, both in Suffolk (1455–1536)). (See also the Waldegrave family.) By Anne Waldegrave (who died in 1589 aged 84, and whose ledger stone survives in All Saints Church, Thornage, Norfolk) he had several children, including:

- Sir John Heigham, eldest son and heir, an M.P. for Ipswich. He married (1), 1562, Anne, daughter of Edmund Wright (died 1583), of Sutton Hall, Bradfield Combust, Suffolk, and (2), Anne, daughter of William Poley of Boxted, Suffolk.
- Thomas Heigham, buried Ampton, Suffolk, 1597.
- William Heigham, of East Ham, Essex, died 1620 aged 73. He married Anne, daughter of Richard Stoneley, Teller of the Exchequer.
- Judith Heigham, died 1571, married John Spelman, of Narborough, Norfolk, the son of Sir John Spelman.
- Dorothy Heigham, married (1561) Sir Charles Framlingham, of Crowes Hall, Debenham, Suffolk.

== Monument ==
Sir Clement is buried in the Church of All Saints at Barrow, Suffolk. Against the south wall of the chancel is a tomb-chest surmounted by a low canopy with a flat-arched roof, ornamented within with quatrefoils and Tudor flowers. Externally the canopy has a horizontal frontage carved with quatrefoils (three enclosing shields, two enclosing double roses) between coursed mouldings, crowned above with a frieze of lozenge-formed crinkled foliage between the slender octagonal columnar quoins which rise at the corners as turrets. The front of the tomb-chest has three lozenges enclosing quatrefoil tracery with a heraldic shield at the centre of each.

Beneath the canopy, a brass memorial of composite construction is set into the upright wall at the back. In the lower part are two large brass rectangular plates set adjacent, containing an epitaph to Sir Clement Heigham in 44 lines of English rhymed heptameter couplets, engraved in very controlled gothic lettering. Directly surmounting these are three figural groups separately mounted. Sir Clement, in full plate armour and with sword, appears centrally: he kneels in prayer at a desk with an open book upon it, his helmet beside it and his gauntlets hanging in front of it. He faces sinister (to the right as viewed), towards a separate group facing towards him, representing his second wife (Anne Waldegrave) kneeling at another desk, and behind her their two daughters, Judith and Dorothy.

Sir Clement faces away from a third group on the dexter side (left as viewed), representing his first wife Anne Munnings kneeling at another desk, with their five daughters, Elizabeth, Margaret, Anne, Frances and Lucy, kneeling behind her. Between Sir Clement and this group is a gap with three rivet holes in the wall, representing a missing fourth group directly behind him which should have shown his sons by his second wife, John, Thomas and William Heigham. Vincent, the son of the first marriage who died in infancy, is shown by a kneeling shrouded chrisom child just behind Sir Clement himself.

Above these images are three heraldic shields. The central one, engraved on a square plate of latten, bears the arms of Heigham (quarterly 1st and 4th Heigham; 2nd and 3rd Francys), including the crest of a horse's head erased, argent. The other two escutcheons are shield-shaped plates. The shield to the right as viewed, above the second wife, contains the arms of Waldegrave, 1st and 4th (shown as a quartering with Montchency, Creake, Vauncy and Moyne), quartered with Fray, 2nd and 3rd. The shield to the left as viewed represents the impalement of the Heigham quartering (as before) on the dexter side, with the Waldegrave quartering (as before) on the sinister side: it is the heraldic representation of the second marriage.

The arms of Heigham (not quartered with Francys) are displayed in a window at Lincoln's Inn.

Parliament of England
| Preceded by Thomas Carus; Thomas Hungate | Member of Parliament for Lancaster; 1558 to 1559; With: William Rice | Succeeded by Sir Thomas Benger; William Fleetwood |
| Preceded by William Bendlowes; Robert Monson | West Looe; 1554 (November) to 1555; With: Ambrose Gilberd | Succeeded by William St Aubyn; John Carnsew |
| Preceded by John Gosnold; John Sulyard | Ipswich; April to November 1554; With: Thomas Poley | Succeeded by Ralph Goodwin; John Smith |
| Preceded by Richard Fletcher; John Holmes | Rye; October 1553 to April 1554; With: John Holmes | Succeeded by John Holmes; Richard Fletcher |

Political offices
| Preceded by Sir Robert Broke | Speaker of the House of Commons; 1554–1555 | Succeeded by Sir John Pollard |
Legal offices
| Preceded by David Brooke | Lord Chief Baron of the Exchequer; 1558–1559 | Succeeded by Sir Edward Saunders |
