= Thomas Bury (judge) =

English judge

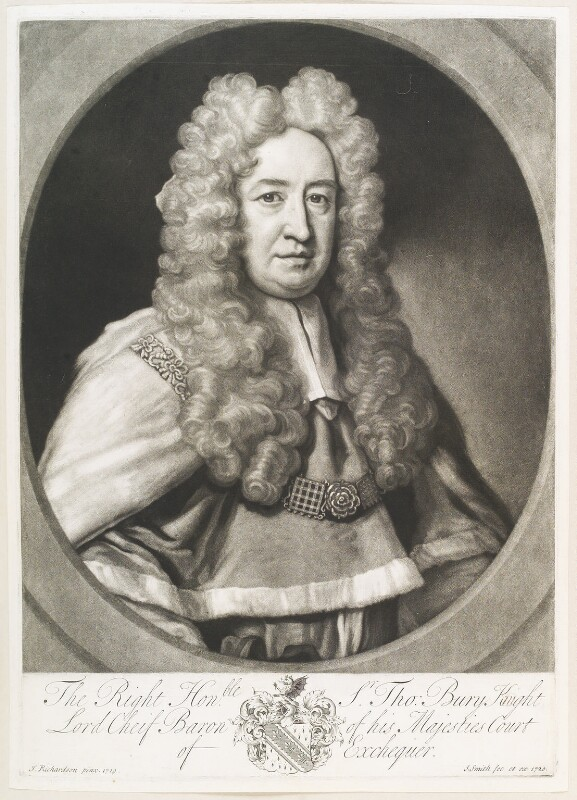
Sir Thomas Bury

Thomas Bury (1655–1722) was an English judge. He took part in the decision regarding the 1704 Aylesbury election. King George I raised Bury to the position of Chief Baron of the Exchequer.

== Early life and education ==
Bury was born in 1655, the youngest son of Sir William Bury, knight, of Linwood, Lincolnshire. In February 1667, Bury earned a bachelor's degree at Lincoln College, Oxford, and entered Gray's Inn as a student the following year.

== Career ==
He was called to the bar in 1676, and after some years' practice became a serjeant-at-law in 1700. Later, on 26 January 1701, when Sir Littleton Powys was removed to the King's Bench, he was made a Baron of the Exchequer. Regarding this appointment, his epitaph says that he "by his Great Application to the Study of the Law, raised himself to one of the highest Degrees in that Profession." Speaker Onslow, in his notes to Bishop Burnet's History, affirms 'that it appeared from Bury's book of accounts' that he gave Lord-keeper Wright a bribe of £1000 for elevating him to the bench. He was knighted the same year. For fifteen years he continued to discharge the duties of a puisne judge.

=== Aylesbury election ===
In 1704, when corrupt practices had extensively prevailed at the Aylesbury election, the Whigs, who were then defeated, knowing that proceeding by a petition to the House of Commons would be useless, caused actions to be brought in the Queen's Bench division by some of the electors against the returning officers. One of these actions, the leading case of Ashby v. White, after judgment for the defendants in the Queen's Bench, from which Lord Chief Justice Holt dissented, was taken to the House of Lords upon a writ of error, and the judges were summoned to advise the house. Of these judges Bury was one, and his opinion was given in support of that of the Lord Chief Justice in the court below; and Lord Somers being of the same opinion, the decision of the queen's bench was reversed by fifty to sixteen. On 20 and 22 April 1710 he, with Chief Justice Parker and Mr. Justice Tracy, at the Old Baile, tried one Damary for riot and being ringleader of a mob.

=== Robert Mann ===
There is a letter of his (25 June 1713) preserved among the treasury papers to the lord high treasurer, about offering a reward for the apprehension of one Robert Mann.

=== Later life ===
On the death of Sir Samuel Dodd, Bury was raised by King George I to be Chief Baron of the Exchequer 10 June 1716. He was elected a Fellow of the Royal Society in 1718.

He died on 4 May 1722, suddenly, having been engaged in the discharge of his judicial duties until within a few hours of his death. He was buried, with a handsome tomb, in the parish church of Grantham, Lincolnshire. He never married and left no issue, and his estates at Irby, near Wainfleet, passed to his grandnephew, William Bury, of Lyndwood Grange, Lincolnshire. There is a portrait of him, engraved in mezzotint by Smith, after a picture by J. Richardson dated 1720.

Legal offices
Preceded by Sir Samuel Dodd	Lord Chief Baron of the Exchequer; 1716-1722	Succeeded by Sir James Montagu
