= William de Thorpe =

English lawyer, Chief Justice of the King's Bench

Sir William de Thorpe
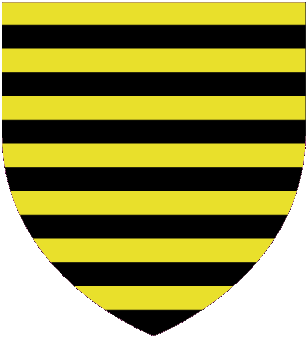
- Arms: Barry of fourteen Or and Sable.

29th Lord Chief Justice of England
- In office 26 November 1346 – 26 October 1350
- Monarch: Edward III
- Prime Minister: Henry of Grosmont, 1st Duke of Lancaster (as Lord High Steward)
- Chancellor: John de Ufford (1346–1349); John of Thoresby (1349–1350)
- Preceded by: William Scott
- Succeeded by: William de Shareshull

Personal details
- Died: 27 May 1361

Sir William de Thorpe (died 27 May 1361) was an English lawyer who was Chief Justice of the King's Bench from 26 November 1346 to 26 October 1350.

As a clerk of this court, he was assaulted on one occasion in 1318, when his enemies allegedly urinated on him. He was knighted in 1345, at the same time as he was made justice of the King's Bench.

Thorpe accumulated great estates, particularly in Lincolnshire, and his wealth must have derived primarily from bribes and maintenance. In 1350, he was imprisoned and condemned to hanging and confiscation of all property. By 1351, however, he had been pardoned and had his property restored. The next year, he was made baron of the exchequer and also held various other commissions.

In 1357, he was excommunicated for non-appearance at the trial of Thomas de Lisle, Bishop of Ely, in Avignon.

He appears to have had a son by the same name.

== Sources ==
- Richard W. Kaeuper, 'Thorp, Sir William (d. 1361)', Oxford Dictionary of National Biography, Oxford University Press, 2004 accessed 9 Aug 2006

Legal offices
Preceded by William Scott	Lord Chief Justice; 1346–1350	Succeeded by William de Shareshull
