= William Shareshull =

William Shareshull may refer to:

- William de Shareshull, English lawyer
- William Shareshull (MP) for Staffordshire (UK Parliament constituency)
