= David Brook =

David Brook may refer to:

- David Brook (songwriter) (born 1987), American songwriter
- David Broke (c. 1498–1560), English judge and member of parliament using various spellings

== See also ==
- David Brooke (disambiguation)
- David Brooks (disambiguation)
