= Richard Richards (judge) =

Welsh politician and judge (1752–1823)

Sir Richard Richards PC DL FRS (5 November 1752 – 11 November 1823) was a Welsh politician and judge. He was Member of Parliament for Helston on two occasions, but only made one speech in Parliament. He was later a successful chancery barrister, eventually becoming Lord Chief Baron of the Exchequer.

== Life ==
Richards was born on 5 November 1752 at Coed, Brithdir, near Dolgellau in Merionethshire. He was the eldest son of Thomas Richards and his wife, Catherine, whose brother (William Parry) was warden of Ruthin, Denbighshire. His grandfather, also called William Parry, was headmaster of Ruthin School and Richards was educated there. Richards then progressed to Oxford University, matriculating as a member of Jesus College, Oxford on 19 March 1771. He transferred to Wadham College, Oxford on 7 May 1773 and obtained his Bachelor of Arts degree on 10 October 1774. He then became a scholar at The Queen's College, Oxford, and after being appointed to a fellowship at Queen's on 17 December 1774, he was awarded his Master of Arts degree on 15 July 1777. In the meantime, Richards had become a member of the Inner Temple (being admitted on 10 May 1775) and he was called to the bar on 12 February 1780.

He was elected a Fellow of the Royal Society in February 1793 as a "Gentleman studious in Natural History".

== Political career ==
In the 1796 general election, Richards was elected as one of the members of parliament for the constituency of Helston, Cornwall. He held the seat until March 1799, when he resigned in favour of Lord Francis Osborne, son of the Duke of Leeds who controlled the seat. He was re-elected at the May 1807 general election, resigning on 29 July 1807 in favour of Sir James Blackwood. During his parliamentary career, he supported the ministry of William Pitt the Younger but made only one reported speech, opposing the Quakers' Relief Bill on 24 February 1797 as unnecessary and inconvenient.

== Legal career ==
Richards' main area of practice was in the Court of Chancery. He was one of the three registrars to the Prerogative Court of the Province of Canterbury from 1788 to 1800, and was appointed counsel to Queen Anne's Bounty in 1789. He became solicitor-general to Queen Charlotte in 1794, becoming attorney-general to the queen in 1801 in succession to William Grant. He was appointed as a Bencher of Inner Temple in 1799, and held the positions of Reader (1804) and Treasurer (1806).

He was a potential appointee to the newly created position of Vice-Chancellor of the Court of Chancery in 1812, since he was the senior chancery barrister who was not an MP, earning £7,000 per year. He was led to believe by his friend Lord Eldon, the Lord Chancellor, that he would be appointed. However, Eldon instead bowed to party-political pressure and appointed the Attorney General, Thomas Plumer, to the new post. Richards was indignant, although he was appeased by his appointment as chief justice of the county palatine of Chester. He resigned that position when he was offered a position of Baron of the Exchequer in February 1814. He had refused this appointment in 1807, but he was now given to understand that he would in due course succeed as Chief Baron. The offer was apparently made when Lord Eldon tossed a note into court addressed to "Taffy". Richards was appointed a Serjeant-at-law on 26 February 1814 and was knighted by the Prince Regent at Carlton House on 11 May 1814. On the death of Sir Alexander Thomson, Richards became Chief Baron on 21 April 1817 and became a Privy Counsellor five days later. He helped clear the backlog of equity appeals and was regarded as a sound and capable judge. He presided over the trials of Jeremiah Brandreth, convicted of treason, and two of the Cato Street conspirators. He also acted as Lord Speaker when Lord Eldon was ill in January 1819.

== Family ==
Richards married Catherine Humphreys, through whom Richards acquired an estate in Caerynwch, Merionethshire; he later became a Deputy Lieutenant of Merionethshire. He had eight sons and two daughters, and was known as "Stumpy Dick". His eldest son Richard Richards (known as "Double Dick") was MP for the constituency of Merioneth from 1836 to 1852. Robert Richards and Griffith Richards (the third and sixth sons) were both appointed Queen's Counsel and both, like their father, became benchers of Inner Temple, as did a grandson and a great-grandson of Sir Richard Richards. Richards died on 11 November 1823 and was buried in the Inner Temple vault; his wife was buried there also on 12 October 1825.

A monument was erected in Dolgellau to a design by Edward Hodges Baily.

Parliament of Great Britain
| Preceded by Sir Stephen Lushington; Charles Abbot | Member of Parliament for Helston; 1796–1799; With: Charles Abbot | Succeeded by Charles Abbot; Lord Francis Osborne |
Parliament of the United Kingdom
| Preceded by John Du Ponthieu; Thomas Brand | Member of Parliament for Helston; 1807; With: Sir John St Aubyn | Succeeded by Sir John St Aubyn; The Lord Dufferin and Claneboye |
Legal offices
| Preceded by Robert Dallas | Chief Justice of Chester; 1813–1814 | Succeeded by Sir William Garrow |
| Preceded by Sir Alexander Thomson | Lord Chief Baron of the Exchequer; 1817–1823 | Succeeded by Sir William Alexander |
