= Joanna Harrington =

Joanna Harrington may refer to:

- Joanna Harrington, fictional character in Night of the Demon
- Joanna Harrington, widow of Laurence Saunders and Marian exile in Foxe's Book of Martyrs
