= Richard Willoughby (judge) =

Member of the Parliament of England

Sir Richard Willoughby (died 1325), otherwise Richard Bugge of Willoughby, was an English landowner, lawyer, judge, and briefly a member of parliament.

The son of Richard Bugge of Willoughby on the Wolds, Nottinghamshire, a successful lawyer, he was trained in the common law at the Inns of Court and called himself after the place where his father owned land. Willoughby had a brother who retained their father’s name and was known as Ralph Bugge.

A notable serjeant-at-law, in 1318 Willoughby was one of the two members of the Parliament of England for Nottinghamshire and in 1323 was appointed as Chief Justice of the Common Pleas for Ireland. He died in 1325.

Willoughby was the father of Richard de Willoughby (c. 1290 – 1362), Lord Chief Justice of England.
