= Sibbertoft =

Village in Northamptonshire, England

Coordinates: 52.4362°N 0.9938°W

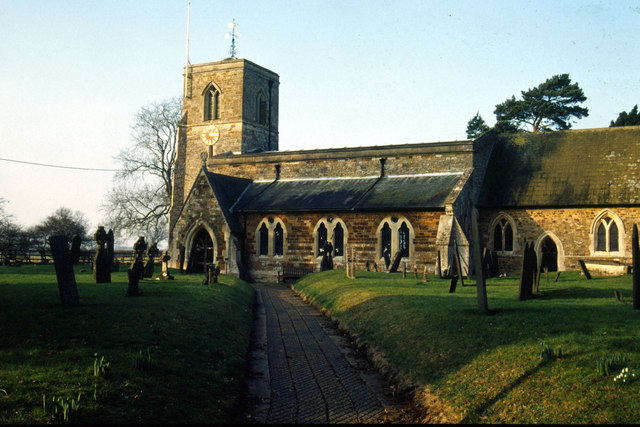
- St Helen's Church, Sibbertoft

- Location within Northamptonshire
- Population: 462 (2011)
- OS grid reference: SP6882
- Unitary authority: West Northamptonshire
- Ceremonial county: Northamptonshire
- Region: East Midlands
- Country: England
- Sovereign state: United Kingdom
- Post town: Market Harborough
- Postcode district: LE16
- Dialling code: 01858
- Police: Northamptonshire
- Fire: Northamptonshire
- Ambulance: East Midlands
- UK Parliament: Kettering

Sibbertoft is a village and civil parish in West Northamptonshire in England. At the time of the 2001 census, the parish's population (including Sulby) was 343 people, increasing to 462 at the 2011 Census.

The village's name means 'curtilage of Sigebeorht' or 'curtilage of Sigbjorn'.

Facilities in the village include a pub, church, recreation ground and the Sibbertoft Reading Room which is in effect the village hall.

== Notable buildings and monuments ==
The Historic England website contains details of the listed buildings in the parish of Sibbertoft. All of them are Grade II apart from the parish church, which is Grade II*.

The listed buildings are:

- St Helen's Church, Church Street
- Two chest tombs and a pair of headstones in the churchyard
- The Springs, 7 Berkeley Street
- The Old School, Church Street, 1846 by Edmund Francis Law
- 41 Welland Rise

There is also a scheduled monument in the parish, a motte and bailey castle known as Castle Yard.

== Geography ==
The source of the River Welland is in the parish and it issues as a spring at Spring Croft, Church Street. Sibbertoft sits astride one of the principal watersheds in England and the plateau of land towards Naseby contains the sources of four rivers flowing west, south and east.

Coombe Hill Hollow, north of the village, is a Site of Special Scientific Interest.

== History ==
There is evidence of Iron Age and Roman settlements within the civil parish. Sibbertoft as a village is mentioned in the Domesday Book, under the ownership of tenant-in-chief Count Robert of Mortain, half-brother of William the Conqueror.

== Notable residents ==
- Miles Joseph Berkeley (1803 – 1889), vicar of Sibbertoft, cryptogamist and a founder of plant pathology
- Sir Edward Saunders (died 1576), Chief Justice of the Queen's Bench
- Lawrence Saunders (1519 – 1555), Marian Protestant martyr (brother of the above)
