= John Fray =

Member of the Parliament of England

Sir John Fray (died 1461) was an English lawyer who was Chief Baron of the Exchequer and a Member of Parliament.

== Biography ==
He was elected Member of Parliament for Hertfordshire in 1419 and 1420.

He served on a number of commissions before being appointed Common Serjeant of London from 1421 to 1422 and Recorder of London from 1422 to 1426. He then served as Baron of the Exchequer from 1426 to 1436 and Chief Baron of the Exchequer from 1436 to 1448.

He had considerable experience of rivers and watermills. Fray had the commission for maintaining the navigation of the River Lea around the years 1430–1440. He owned watermills in Essex and interests in other property across the country. These included Cowley Hall in Hillingdon which adjoined the Frays River. The Frays River is a branch of the River Colne which may have been developed to feed watermills in the area. It is said that John Fray arranged for the cutting of a link from the Colne to a tributary rising in Harefield to increase the water volume.

He was knighted before March 1459.

== Personal life and death ==
He died in 1461 and was buried in the church of St. Bartholomew the Less, London. He was the second husband of Agnes Danvers, daughter of fellow MP John Danvers, and by her had five daughters. His eldest daughter Elizabeth married in turn Sir Thomas Waldegrave (1441–1500) and Sir William Saye (born 1454). His daughter Catherine (1437–1482) married Humphrey Stafford.

Legal offices
Preceded by Sir John Juyn	Lord Chief Baron of the Exchequer; 1438–1438	Succeeded by Peter Ardern
