= William Cusance =

English administrator

William Cusance (died c. 5 May 1360) was an English administrator who served as treasurer from 1341 to 1344.

Of a Burgundian family, he made his career in the court of Edward II through the patronage of Hugh Despenser the younger. He served in 1320 as keeper of the great wardrobe but did not, however, suffer from the downfall of the Despensers and Edward II in 1327, as by this time he was associated with the household of prince Edward, the soon-to-be Edward III. He also spent some time around 1332 as keeper of the wardrobe of the king's brother, the earl of Cornwall. Before his appointment as treasurer in 1341, he served briefly in 1349–1350 as keeper of the king's household wardrobe.

A later appointment as archdeacon of Cornwall was challenged by a papal nominee, and Cusance was drawn into a lengthy legal battle.

Political offices
Preceded by Robert Parning	Lord High Treasurer; 1341–1344	Succeeded by William Edington
