= John Stowford =

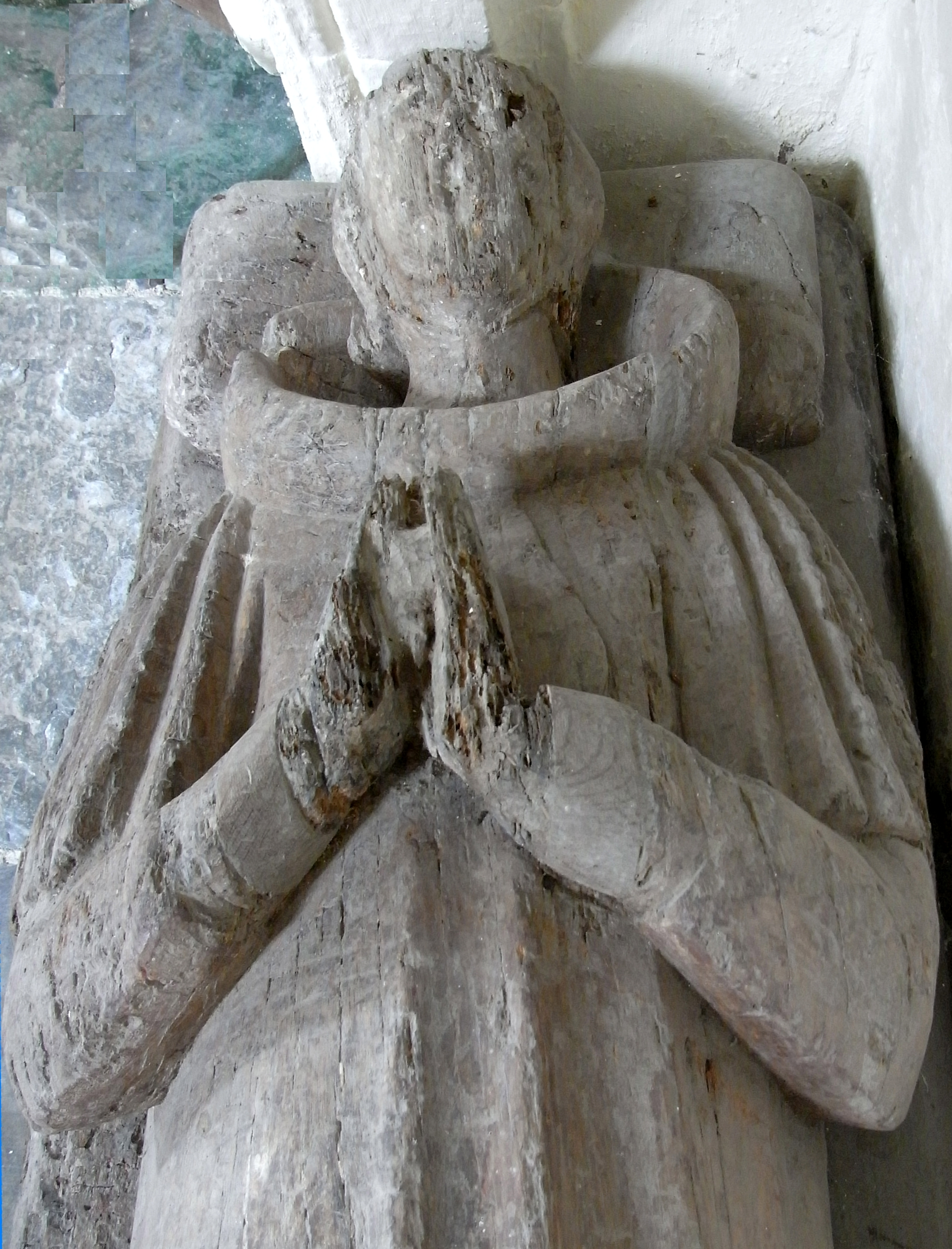
Detail of effigy of Sir John Stowford, West Down Church, Devon

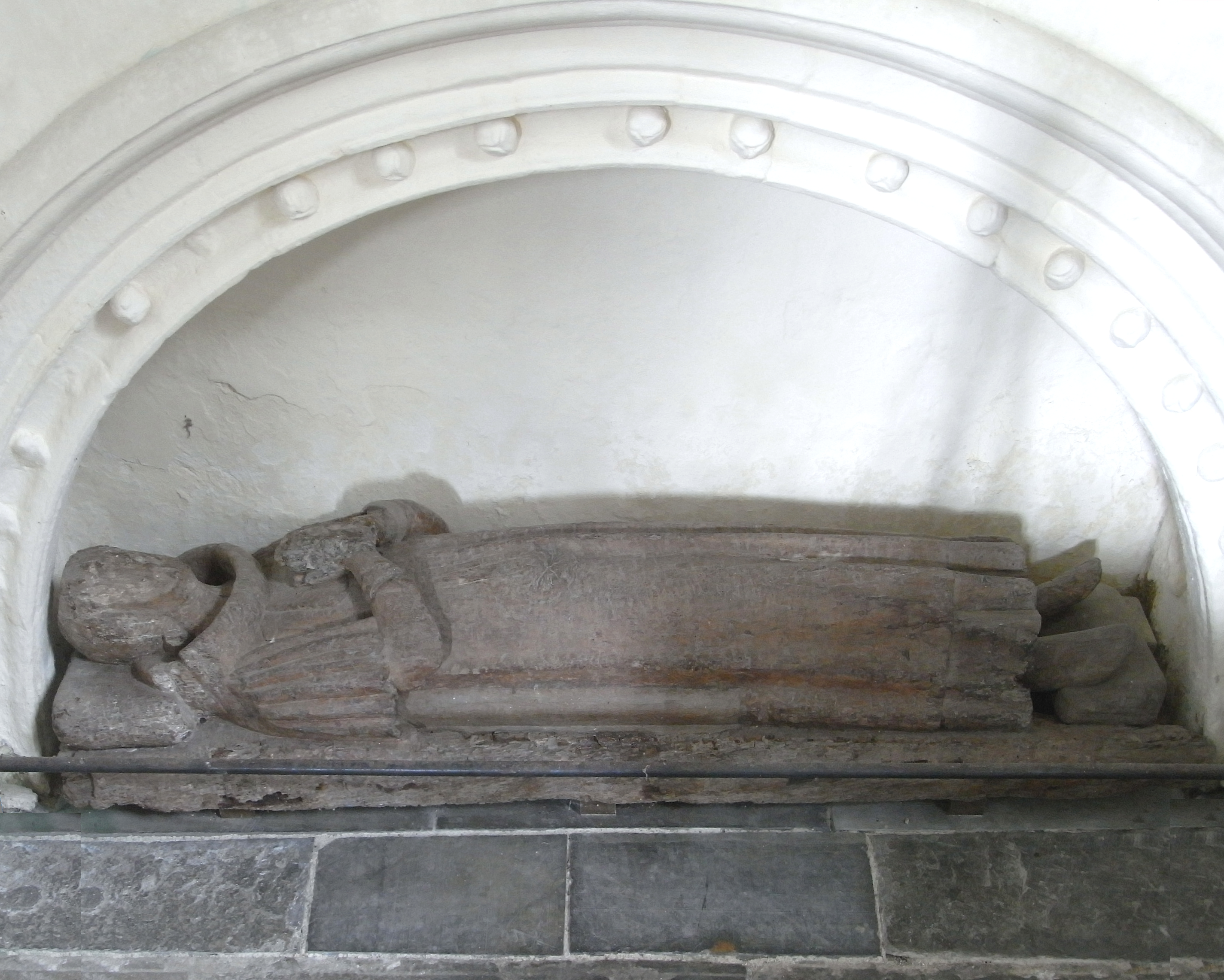
Effigy of Sir John Stowford, West Down Church, Devon

Sir John Stowford (c.1290 – c.1372) of Stowford, West Down in Devon, was Chief Baron of the Exchequer in 1346. He is one of John Prince's Worthies of Devon.

== Origins ==
He was born at the family estate of Stowford in the parish of West Down in North Devon.

== Career ==
It is not known at which Inn of Court he trained as a lawyer, but he was called to the bar and became a serjeant at law. In 1341 he was appointed King's Serjeant to King Edward III. In 1346 he was knighted and was appointed Chief Baron of the Exchequer. In 1349 he was appointed one of the Justices Itinerant for the county of Kent.

== Builds Pilton Causeway ==
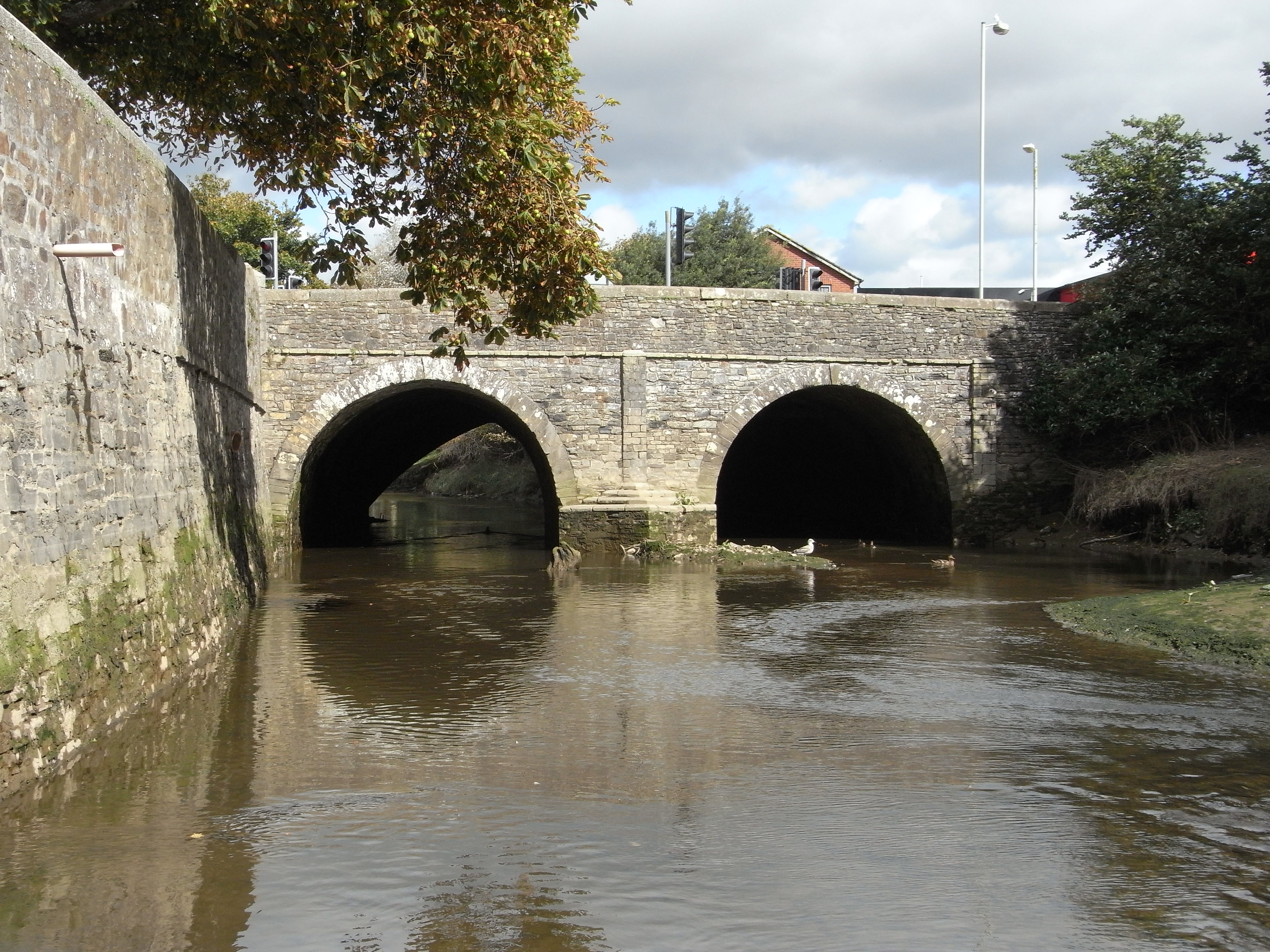
Bridge over River Yeo at northern end of Pilton Causeway linking towns of Barnstaple and Pilton. Built by Sir John Stowford

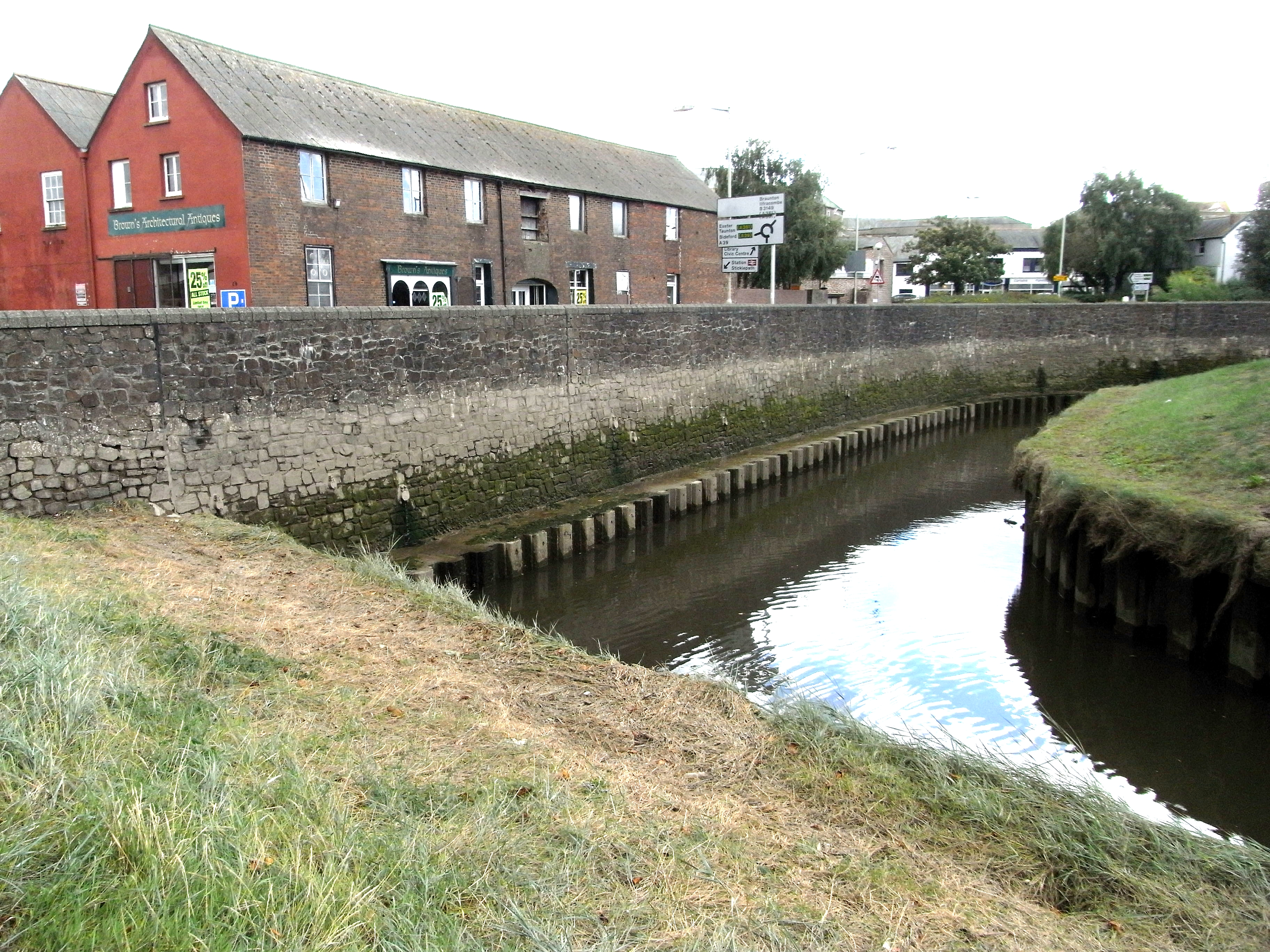
Pilton Causeway, looking towards Barnstaple. Here it crosses the tip of one of the meanders in the River Yeo. Built by Sir John Stowford

Stowford built Pilton Causeway which links the towns of Barnstaple and Pilton, which were then separated by the treacherous marshy ground in which flowed the tidal meanders of the small River Yeo. It is recounted by Prince that Stowford decided on building the causeway when on his way from his home at Stowford to Barnstaple, he met whilst fording the Yeo, the drowned bodies of a woman with her child. He is also believed to have contributed to the financing of the long-bridge in Barnstaple.

== Marriage ==
He married Joan Tracy, a co-heiress of the Tracy family of Woolacombe Tracy, Devon.

== Death and burial ==
He died at Stowford and was buried in the Stowford Chapel in the north transept of West Down Church, where survives his much-worn life-size effigy carved in oak, dressed in his robes of office, set on the floor under a low recessed arch set into the north wall. The colouring of the effigy was renewed in 1873, but no trace survives today.

== Sources ==
- Prince, John, (1643–1723) The Worthies of Devon, 1810 edition, pp. 727–729, biography of Sir John Stowford

Legal offices
Preceded by Sir William de Shareshull	Chief Baron of the Exchequer; 1346	Succeeded by Sir Robert Sadington
