= Geoffrey le Scrope =

English lawyer and Chief Justice of the King's Bench

Sir Geoffrey le Scrope

18th Lord Chief Justice of England
- In office 21 March 1324 – 1 May 1329
- Monarchs: Edward II; Edward III
- Prime Minister: Henry, 3rd Earl of Lancaster (as Lord High Steward)
- Chancellor: Robert Baldock (1324-1327); John Hotham (1327-1328)
- Preceded by: Hervey de Stanton
- Succeeded by: Robert de Malberthorp

21st Lord Chief Justice of England
- In office 29 December 1330 – 28 March 1332
- Monarch: Edward III
- Prime Minister: Henry, 3rd Earl of Lancaster (as Lord High Steward)
- Chancellor: John de Stratford
- Preceded by: Henry le Scrope
- Succeeded by: Richard de Willoughby

23rd Lord Chief Justice of England
- In office 20 September 1332 – 10 September 1333
- Monarch: Edward III
- Prime Minister: Henry, 3rd Earl of Lancaster (as Lord High Steward)
- Chancellor: John de Stratford
- Preceded by: Richard de Willoughby
- Succeeded by: Richard de Willoughby

25th Lord Chief Justice of England
- In office 1337 – October 1338
- Monarch: Edward III
- Prime Minister: Henry, 3rd Earl of Lancaster (as Lord High Steward)
- Chancellor: Robert de Stratford
- Preceded by: Richard de Willoughby
- Succeeded by: Richard de Willoughby

Personal details
- Born: c. 1285
- Died: 2 December 1340 (aged 54–55) Ghent, County of Flanders
- Resting place: Coverham Abbey, North Yorkshire
- Spouse: Ivette de Ros
- Relations: Henry le Scrope (brother)
- Children: Henry Scrope, 1st Baron Scrope of Masham; Thomas Scrope; William Scrope; Stephen Scrope; Geoffrey Scrope; Lady Beatrice Luttrell; Lady Constance Luttrell; Ivetta de Hothom
- Parent: William le Scrope (father)

Sir Geoffrey le Scrope (1285 – 2 December 1340) was an English lawyer, and Chief Justice of the King's Bench for four periods between 1324 and 1338.

== Life ==
He was the son of Sir William le Scrope, who was bailiff to the earl of Richmond in Richmondshire. Geoffrey's older brother Henry was also a lawyer, and served as Chief Justice twice, 1317–23 and 1329–30. His mother was Constance, daughter and heiress of Thomas, son of Gillo de Newsham, variously described as of Newsham-on-Tees and of Newsham-on-Tyne. Geoffrey Scrope certainly had an estate at Whalton, near Morpeth, a few miles south-east of which there is a Newsham, but it is not upon the Tyne.

Alternatively, the Scrope of Bolton Cartulary contains an undated deed which shows that Constance, the wife of William le Scrope was the daughter of Geoffrey son of William de Wensley.

Like his brother, Scrope adopted the profession of the law, and by 1316 he was king's serjeant. He is also called 'valettus regis.' He was summoned to councils and parliaments, and occasionally sat on judicial commissions. In the baronial conflicts of the reign of Edward II he was a loyal adherent of the crown. He was involved in the proceedings both against Thomas of Lancaster and Andrew Harclay. He was knighted in 1323, and became Chief Justice for the first time on 21 March 1324. He managed, however, to survive politically the overthrow both of Edward II in 1326 and of Roger Mortimer in 1330.

After retiring as a justice, he campaigned with Edward III in Flanders, and distinguished himself as a soldier. He was also one of the instigators behind the king's actions against Archbishop Stratford in 1340. The small estate he held as early as 1312 in Coverdale, south of Wensleydale, he augmented before 1318, by the acquisition of the manor of Clifton on Ure at the entrance of the latter dale, where he obtained a license to build a castle in that year. Early in the next reign he purchased the neighbouring manor of Masham from the representatives of its old lords, the Wautons, who held it from the Mowbrays by the service of an annual barbed arrow. Eltham Mandeville and other Vesci lands in Kent had passed into his hands by 1318. One of Edward II's last acts was to invest him with the great castle and honour of Skipton in Craven forfeited by Roger, lord Clifford. So closely was he identified with the court party that Mortimer was alleged to have projected the same fate for him as for the Despensers. But though Edward's deposition was followed by Scrope's removal from office, he received a pardon in February 1328, and was reinstated as chief justice.

He was a soldier and diplomatist as well as a lawyer, and his services in the former capacities were in such request that his place had frequently to be supplied by substitutes, one of whom was his brother Henry, and for a time (1334–7) he seems to have exchanged his post for the (nominal) second justiceship of the common pleas. Again chief justice in 1338, he finally resigned the office before October in that year on the outbreak of the French war.

In the tournaments of the previous reign, at one of which he was knighted, Scrope had not disgraced the azure bend or of his family, which he bore with a silver label for difference, and in the first months of Edward III's rule he was with the army which nearly joined battle with the Scots at Stanhope Park in Weardale. But it was in diplomatic business that Edward III found Scrope most useful. He took him to France in 1329. In 1331 and 1333, he was entrusted with important foreign missions. He had only just been designated (1334) one of the deputies to keep a watch over John Baliol when he was sent on an embassy to Brittany and France. In 1335 and again in 1337, Scottish affairs engaged his attention.

Just before crossing to Flanders in 1338 Edward III sent Scrope with the Earl of Northampton to his ally the emperor, and later in the year he was employed in the negotiations opened at the eleventh hour with Philip VI. He had at least six knights in his train, and took the field in the campaign which ended bloodlessly at Buironfosse (1339). Galfrid le Baker (p. 65) relates the well-known anecdote of Scrope's punishing Cardinal Bernard de Montfavence's boasts of the inviolability of France by taking him up a high tower and showing him her frontiers all in flames.

He now appears with the formal title of king's secretary, and spent the winter of 1339–40 in negotiating a marriage between the heir of Flanders and Edward's daughter Isabella. Returning to England with the King in February, he was granted two hundred marks a year to support his new dignity of banneret. Going back to Flanders in June, he took part in the siege of Tournay, and about Christmas died at Ghent. His body was carried to Coverham Abbey, to which he had given the rectory of the churches of Sedbergh and Dent in the West Riding. Jervaulx and other monasteries had also experienced his liberality. Besides his Yorkshire and Northumberland estates, he left manors in five other counties. Scrope was the more distinguished of the two notable brothers whose unusual fortune it was to found two great baronial families within the limits of a single Yorkshire dale.

== Family ==
Geoffrey and his wife, Ivette (de Ros) -- in all probability daughter of Sir William de Ros of Ingmanthorpe, near Wetherby—had five sons. Their eldest son, Henry (whose daughter Joan married Henry Fitzhugh), became the first Baron Scrope of Masham.

By this marriage, he had five sons and three daughters:

- Henry, first baron Scrope of Masham;
- Thomas, who predeceased his father;
- William (1325?–1367), who fought at the Battle of Crécy, Poitiers, and Najara, and died in Spain;
- Stephen, who was at the Battle of Crécy and the siege of Berwick (1356);
- Geoffrey (died 1383), LL.B. (probably of Oxford), prebendary of Lincoln, London, and York.
- Beatrice, who married Sir Andrew Luttrell of Lincolnshire
- Constance, who married Sir Geoffrey Luttrell of Lincolnshire
- Ivetta, the wife of John de Hothom

A second marriage with Lora, daughter of Gerard de Furnival of Hertfordshire and Yorkshire, and widow of Sir John Ufflete or Usflete, has been inferred from a gift of her son, Gerard Ufflete, to Scrope and his mother jointly in 1331; but Ivetta is named as Scrope's wife in 1332.

== Sources ==
- E.L.G. Stones, 'Sir Geoffrey le Scrope (c. 1285–1340), chief justice of the king's bench', English Historical Review, 69 (1954), pp. 1–17.
- Brigette Vale (2004). "Scrope, Sir Geoffrey (d. 1340)". Oxford Dictionary of National Biography. Oxford Dictionary of National Biography (online ed.). Oxford University Press. doi:10.1093/ref:odnb/24955. (Subscription, Wikipedia Library access or UK public library membership required.)

Legal offices
Preceded by Hervey de Stanton	Lord Chief Justice; 1324–1329	Succeeded by Robert de Malberthorp
Preceded by Henry le Scrope	Lord Chief Justice; 1330–1332	Succeeded by Richard de Willoughby
Preceded by Richard de Willoughby	Lord Chief Justice; 1332–1333	Succeeded by Richard de Willoughby
Preceded by Richard de Willoughby	Lord Chief Justice; 1337–1338	Succeeded by Richard de Willoughby
