= Peter Ardern =

Chief Baron of the Exchequer

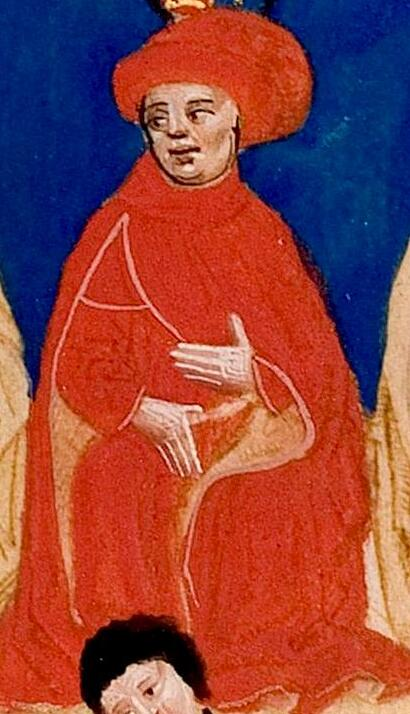
Depiction of a Chief Baron of the Exchequer contemporary to Ardern's term in office

Peter Arderne (died 1467) was an English lawyer who was Chief Baron of the Exchequer and occasionally sat as a Justice of the King's Bench (until 1467).

He was born about 1420 in Sussex, England and is not known whether he had any siblings. In his twenties probably, he married Katherine Sywardby and had two daughters with her, Elizabeth Arden and Anne (Arden) Bohun. He is also known to have bought Markhall estate sometime in 1446. He died around 1467 at an age of about 47 and was buried in the church of St Mary-at-Latton, where he built a chantry chapel in 1447 for his family.

He served first as a Baron of the Exchequer and then as the Chief Baron of the Exchequer from 1448 to 1463.

Legal offices
Preceded by Sir John Fray	Lord Chief Baron of the Exchequer; 1448–1463	Succeeded by Richard Illingworth
