= Robert Parning =

Member of the Parliament of England

Sir Robert Parning

Lord High Chancellor of England
- In office 1341–1343
- Monarch: Edward III
- Prime Minister: Henry, 3rd Earl of Lancaster (as Lord High Steward)
- Preceded by: Robert Bourchier
- Succeeded by: Robert Sadington

Lord High Treasurer
- In office 15 January 1341 – 30 October 1341
- Monarch: Edward III
- Prime Minister: Henry, 3rd Earl of Lancaster (as Lord High Steward)
- Chancellor: Robert Bourchier
- Preceded by: Roger Northburgh
- Succeeded by: William Cusance

27th Lord Chief Justice of England
- In office 21 July 1340 – 8 January 1341
- Monarch: Edward III
- Prime Minister: Henry, 3rd Earl of Lancaster (as Lord High Steward)
- Chancellor: Robert Bourchier
- Preceded by: Richard de Willoughby
- Succeeded by: William Scott

Personal details
- Died: 26 August 1343 London
- Spouse: Isabel Parning

Sir Robert Parning (or Parving; died 26 August 1343) was an English lawyer and administrator.

== Life ==
The son of Robert Parning of Cumberland, he was five times knight of the shire in Parliament for his native Cumberland (1325, 1327, 1328, 1331 and 1332).

He became serjeant-at-law in 1329 and served as King's Serjeant from 1333 to 1339 and Chief Justice of the King's Bench from 1340 to 1341. He was Treasurer from January to October 1341 and Chancellor from 1341 to 1343. He was knighted in 1340.

== Family ==
Parning was married to Isabel, but had no surviving sons. When he died in London in 1343 his inheritance was divided up between his two sisters.

== See also ==
- List of lord chancellors and lord keepers
- List of lord high treasurers of England and Great Britain

== Sources ==
- Kingsford, C. L., 'Parning, Sir Robert (d. 1343)', rev. W. M. Ormrod, Oxford Dictionary of National Biography, Oxford University Press, 2004 , retrieved 8 Aug 2006. The first edition of this text is available at Wikisource: Lee, Sidney, ed. (1895). "Parning, Robert" . Dictionary of National Biography. Vol. 43. London: Smith, Elder & Co.
- Powicke, F. Maurice and E. B. Fryde Handbook of British Chronology 2nd. ed. London:Royal Historical Society 1961

Legal offices
| Preceded by Richard de Willoughby | Lord Chief Justice; 1340–1341 | Succeeded by William Scott |
Political offices
| Preceded by Roger Northburgh | Lord High Treasurer; 1341–1341 | Succeeded by William Cusance |
| Preceded by Robert Bourchier | Lord Chancellor; 1341–1343 | Succeeded by Robert Sadington |
