= James Montagu (judge) =

English lawyer and politician

Sir James Montagu (2 February 1666 – 1723), of the Middle Temple, London, was an English lawyer and Whig politician, who sat in the House of Commons at various times between 1695 and 1713. He became a judge and also served as Solicitor General and Attorney General.

== Early life ==
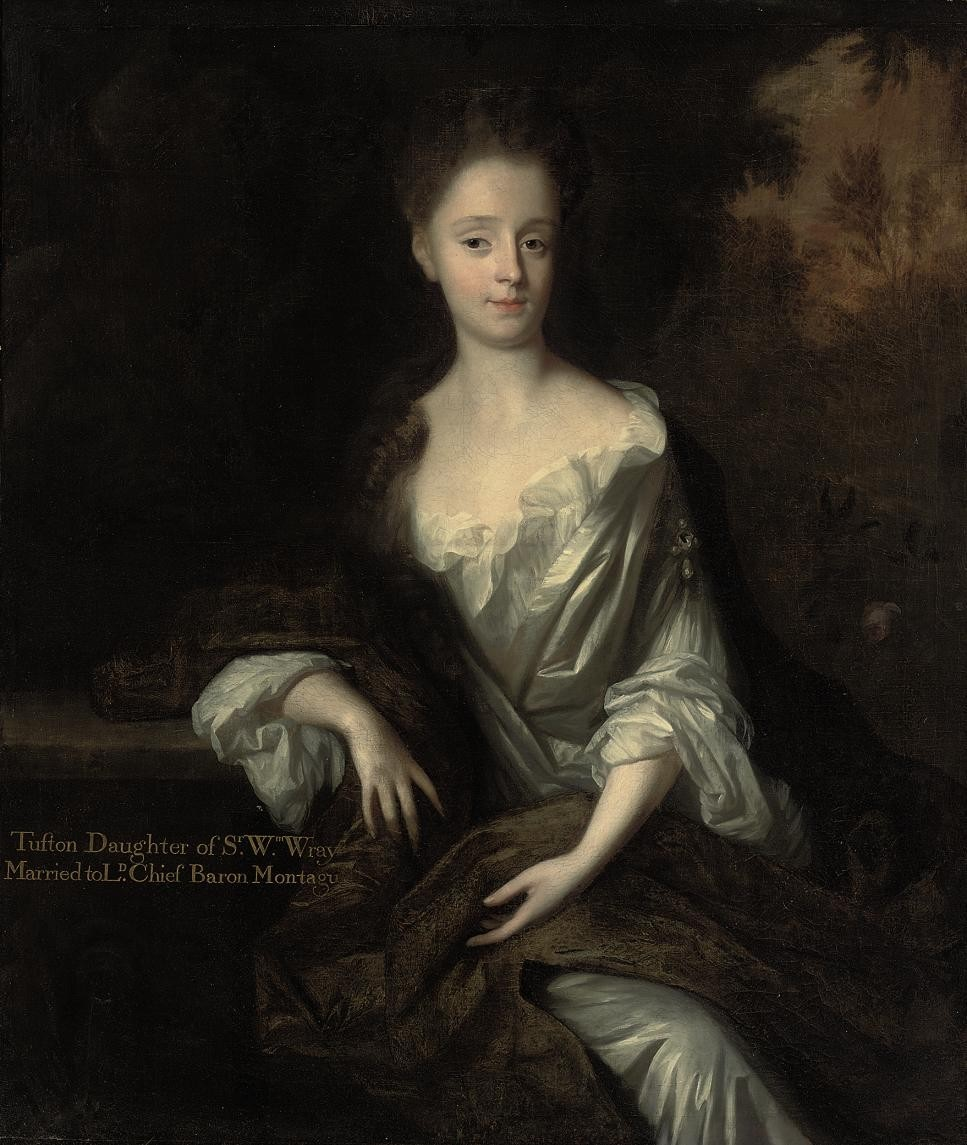
Tufton Montagu (nee Wray)

Montagu was the seventh, but fifth surviving son of George Montagu of Horton, Northamptonshire, and his wife Elizabeth Irby, daughter of Sir Anthony Irby and was baptized at Horton on 5 March 1666. His grandfather was Henry Montagu, 1st Earl of Manchester. He was educated at Westminster School and was admitted at Trinity College, Cambridge and Middle Temple in 1683. In 1689 he was called to the bar from Lincoln's Inn. He was appointed secretary to the chancellor of Exchequer in April 1694. He married Tufton Wray, daughter of Sir William Wray, 1st Baronet, of Ashby on 6 October 1694.

== Career ==
At the 1695 English general election Montagu was returned in a contest as Member of Parliament for Tregony. By 1698 he was counsel for Cambridge University when he was awarded MA and was also appointed chief justice of Ely. He was returned as MP for Beeralston in a by-election on 30 December 1698, but did not stand in the 1701 general elections or at the 1702 English general election. In 1704 he successfully defended John Tutchin, indicted for a libel published in his periodical, The Observator, and two years later he was leading counsel in the prosecution of Beau Fielding for bigamy in marrying the Duchess of Cleveland. In 1705 he was committed by the House of Commons to the custody of the serjeant-at-arms for having in 1704 demanded a habeas corpus on behalf of the group of Aylesbury men, whom the house had committed to Newgate Prison for bringing actions against the returning officer. Montagu pleaded strongly against the privilege claimed by the Commons. He remained in custody from 26 February to 14 March, when parliament was prorogued and afterwards dissolved. In April 1705 he was knighted at Cambridge, and was made a Q.C. in November of the same year.

Montagu was next returned to Parliament as MP for Carlisle after a contest at the 1705 English general election. He became solicitor-general and also Bencher of his Inn in 1707. At the 1708 British general election he was returned unopposed as MP for Carlisle. He was appointed attorney-general in September 1708 and was Treasurer of his Inn in 1708 and Library Keeper in 1709. As attorney-general Montagu opened the case in the House of Lords against Henry Sacheverell. At the 1710 British general election he was returned in a contest as MP for Carlisle. With the change of Administration he lost his position as Attorney-general in September 1710. The queen then granted him a pension, which was made the subject of a motion brought before the house in 1711. In this motion, Colonel Gledhill represented it as intended to defray the expenses of Montagu's election at Carlisle, but the charge was disproved. Montagu was dean of the Chapel at Lincoln's Inn in 1711. He did not stand at the 1713 British general election.

Montagu's wife Tufton had died in 1712, and he married, as his second wife, his cousin Elizabeth Montagu, daughter of Robert Montagu, 3rd Earl of Manchester, on 6 October 1713. He became serjeant-at-law on 26 October 1714, was made a Baron of the Exchequer on 22 November 1714. Also in 1714, he became joint collector of tunnage and poundage, for the Port of London for life. He was lord commissioner of the great seal (on the resignation of Lord Cowper) from 18 April to 12 May 1718, when Lord Parker became lord chancellor. He became Chief Baron of the Exchequer in May 1722.

== Death and legacy ==
Montagu died on 1 October 1723 leaving a son and a daughter by his first wife. He was succeeded by his son Charles who sat as a Whig Member of Parliament for St. Albans. His daughter Elizabeth, married Sir Clement Wearg. Montagu's brother was Charles Montagu, 1st Earl of Halifax.

Parliament of England
Preceded by Hugh Fortescue; The Earl of Kildare	Member of Parliament for Tregony; 1695–1698; With: Francis Robartes	Succeeded by Francis Robartes; Philip Meadowes
Preceded by Sir Rowland Gwynne; John Hawles	Member of Parliament for Bere Alston; 1698–1701; With: John Hawles	Succeeded by Sir Rowland Gwynne; Sir Peter King
Preceded by Christopher Musgrave; Thomas Stanwix	Member of Parliament for Carlisle; 1705–1707; With: Thomas Stanwix	Succeeded by Parliament of Great Britain
Parliament of Great Britain
Preceded by Parliament of England	Member of Parliament for Carlisle; 1707–1713; With: Thomas Stanwix	Succeeded by Thomas Stanwix; Sir Christopher Musgrave, Bt
Legal offices
Preceded by Sir Simon Harcourt	Solicitor General; 1707–1708	Succeeded by Robert Eyre
Preceded by Sir Simon Harcourt	Attorney General; 1708–1710	Succeeded by Sir Simon Harcourt
Preceded by Sir Thomas Bury	Chief Baron of the Exchequer; 1722–1723	Succeeded by Sir Robert Eyre
