= Coombe Hill Hollow =

Protected area in Northamptonshire, England

Coordinates: 52.446°N 1.003°W

- Site of Special Scientific Interest
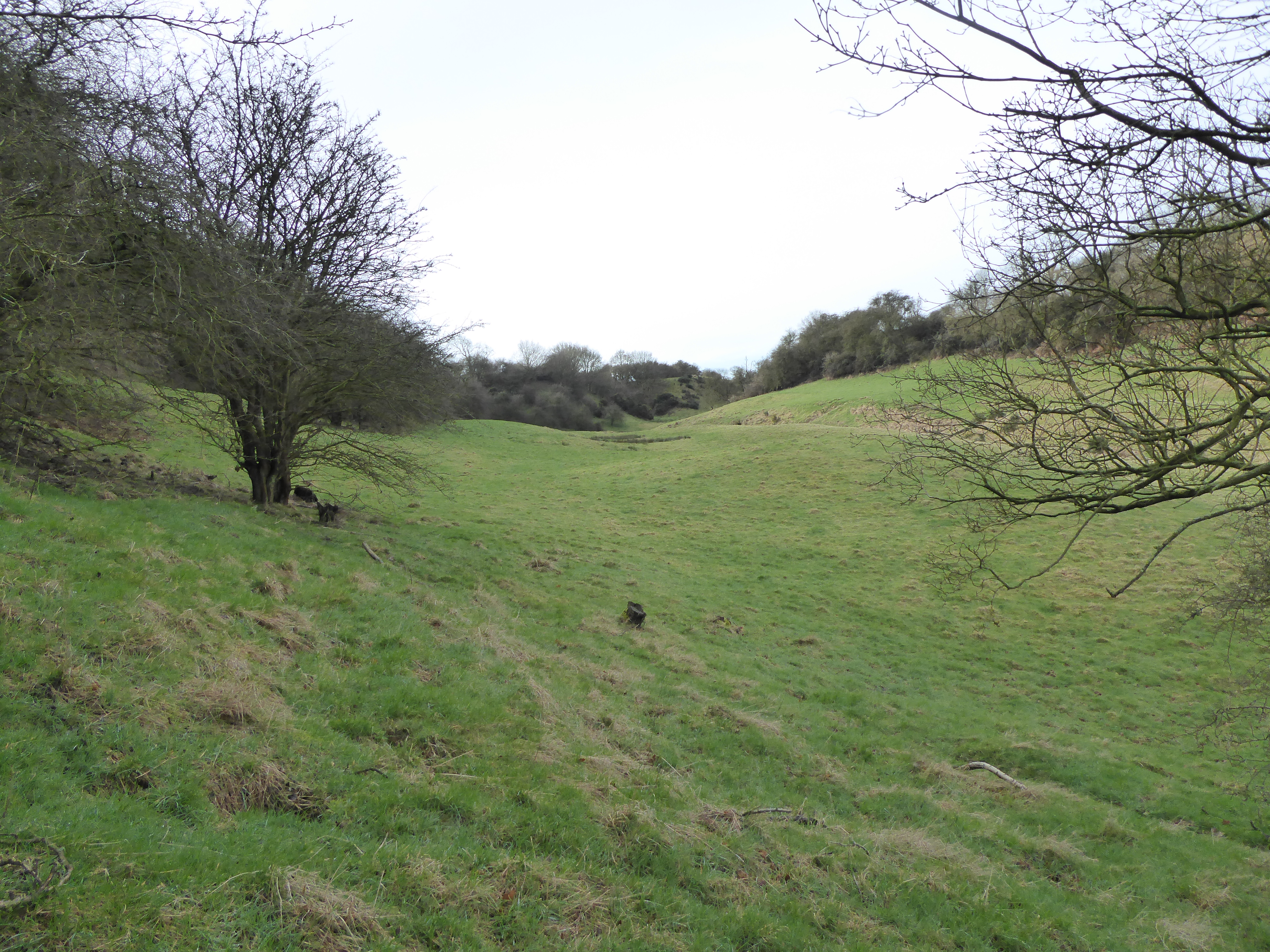
- Location of Coombe Hill Hollow.
- Area of search: Northamptonshire
- Grid reference: SP 678 835
- Interest: Biological
- Area: 4.3 hectares
- Notification date: 1983
- Location map: Magic Map

Coombe Hill Hollow is a 4.3-hectare (11-acre) biological Site of Special Scientific Interest north of Sibbertoft in Northamptonshire, England.

This steep narrow valley has neutral grassland which has never been subject to fertilisers or herbicides, and it has diverse flora. Grasses include brown bent, red fescue, Yorkshire fog and crested dog's-tail. Lime-rich areas have harebell and mouse-ear hawkweed, and there are locally important butterfly populations. Other habitats include bramble, gorse and woods.

The site is private land with no public access.
