= St Helen's Church, Sibbertoft =

Church in Northamptonshire, England

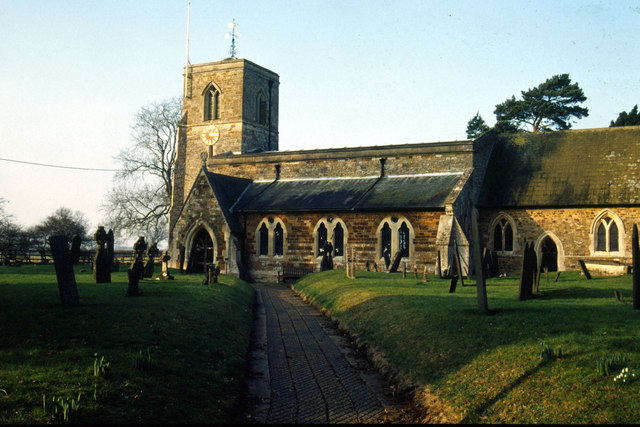
- St Helen's Church, Sibbertoft
- 52°26′19″N 0°59′56″W
- Denomination: Church of England

Administration
- Province: Canterbury
- Diocese: Diocese of Peterborough
- Archdeaconry: Northampton
- Deanery: Brixworth

Clergy
- Rector: Rev Janet Donaldson

St Helen's Church is the Church of England parish church of the village of Sibbertoft in Northamptonshire. It is a Grade II* listed building and stands on the west side of Church Street at the north end of the village.

There was presumably a church at Sibbertoft by 1086, when the Domesday Book records the presence of a priest there.

The main structure of the present building was erected in the 13th and 14th centuries. It now consists of a nave, north and south aisles, chancel and west tower. The walls are constructed of lias and cobble and the covering of the roof is slate.

One bay of the north elevation to west end of nave has a late C13 two-light window and evidence of a blocked window at the junction of the north aisle. Many other sections of the medieval building have been dated to the 14th century, such as the chancel arch, the north nave arcade, the inner arch of the porch and, probably, the tower. A fragment survives of the rood screen as a carving that is now over the south chancel door, decorated in the form of twisted branches and crocketing.

Major Victorian restoration of the church took place about 1862-3 by Edward Browning. This work included construction of the south aisle and porch. Features from that era include the south arcade of the nave, a decorative tiled floor, a pulpit supported on 7 marble pillars, a font with marble pillars and stained glass windows.

Monuments in the church include a marble tablet commemorating Ambrose Saunders (died 1765) which can be seen on the west wall of the north aisle. Two chest tombs and a pair of headstones in the churchyard are Grade II listed.

The parish registers survive from 1680, the historic registers being deposited at Northamptonshire Record Office.

Sibbertoft is part of a united Benefice along with Marston Trussell and Welford. Each parish retains its own church building.
