= Robert de Malberthorp =

English lawyer and Chief Justice of the King's Bench

Sir Robert de Malberthorp

19th Lord Chief Justice of England
- In office 1 May 1329 – 28 October 1329
- Monarch: Edward III
- Prime Minister: Henry, 3rd Earl of Lancaster (as Lord High Steward)
- Chancellor: Henry Burghersh
- Preceded by: Geoffrey le Scrope
- Succeeded by: Henry le Scrope

Personal details
- Died: c. 1332
- Resting place: Saint Mary's Parish Church, Mablethorpe, Lincolnshire
- Parent: Sir William of Malberthorpe (father)

Sir Robert de Malberthorp (d. 1331/1332) was an English lawyer, and Chief Justice of the King's Bench in 1329. He was the son and heir of Sir William of Malberthorpe, lord of the manor of Mablethorpe, Lincolnshire, which was located on the site of the present Mablethorpe Hall.

== Biography ==
Sir Robert Malberthorp was a serjeant at the Common Bench by 1299. In 1311 he was working for the city of London, and in 1313-14 he was employed as serjeant by Thomas of Lancaster. On 1 August 1320 he was appointed justice of the king's bench. He worked on several legal commissions in this period, many in his native Lincolnshire and surrounding counties. One commission in particular was designed to help the Despensers gain the Lordship of Gower against John Mowbray and his allies.

It was Malberthorp who, in the king's name, passed a judgement of death over the rebellious Thomas of Lancaster, after Lancaster's defeat at the Battle of Boroughbridge. For this Malberthorp would need a pardon after the fall of Edward II. Yet he remained in favour at court under the new regime of Roger Mortimer, and later under the personal government of Edward III. In February 1329 he was involved in sessions against rebels led by Thomas' brother, Henry of Lancaster.

The pinnacle of Malberthorp's career came on 1 May 1329, when he was made Chief Justice of the King's Bench. He held this position, however, only until 28 October, when he was appointed Lord Chief Justice of Common Pleas. He remained in this position until a duel with Robert de Montalt, at Earls Bridge on the outskirts of Mablethorpe. Both men died of their wounds. Mablethorpe was buried at St Mary's Church, Mablethorpe, where there is still an effigy of him in the church. The head of the figure rests on a pillow upheld by angels, and beneath the feet are two dragons engaged in fierce combat. The tail of the one impaled by the spur of the knight, while the foot resting on the back of the other.

Robert de Montalt was buried in the chancel at All Saints Church in Maltby Le Marsh in Lincolnshire. His tomb bears an effigy of a cross-legged knight wearing chain mail and surcoat. At his head are two angels, by a pillow, and at his feet two lions biting each other.

== Family feud ==
The De Malberthorp's and the De Montalt's were two of Mablethorpe's most noble families. But a family feud, which lasted for 96 years, arose over a quarrel as to who would present the next Rectors at Saint Mary's and Saint Peter's parish churches. Roger de Montalt and Thomas, son of Endo de Malberthorp in the year of 1233, disputed the right of presenting the Rector of St Mary's. A decision was made that Thomas should present the Rector who was Richard de Wyverton.

The feud came to a conclusion when, on 26 December 1329, Robert de Montalt met Robert de Malberthorp on the bridge (two miles west of Mablethorpe), Robert De Montalt had accused Robert De Malberthorp of cowardice in battle and told him to get out of his way, Robert De Malberthorp resented the unjust rumour and refused to move, Robert De Montalt began to have doubts, but he did not dare to withdraw the charge as if he did, his five-week bride would think him afraid.

The duel would settle the matter and whoever survived the duel would gain "satisfaction", by restoring one's honour by demonstrating a willingness to risk one's life for it. The De Montalt's stood on the side of earls bridge towards Maltby le Marsh and the Malberthorp's stood on the side nearest to Mablethorpe. The two Earls duelled in ghastly determination and both men understood of which in open conflict, one of the Earls had to kill the other one and that one of them would not be crossing the bridge alive.

Records state that the men attacked each other "like lions". Evenly matched and experienced in weaponry, they fought for hours, but eventually sword strokes took their toll on each and the two knights fell dead together. Robert De Malberthorp's daughter Elizabeth, who was married Thomas Fitzwilliam II of Sprotbrough in Yorkshire, inherited her father's Manor and lands in Mablethorpe. The Fitzwilliam family were to live at Mablethorpe for a total of 290 years.

Robert's de Montalt's nephew Robert de Morley inherited his uncle's lands. In 1332 a subsidy roll was made and in the same year a tax was levied on freeholders, sokemen and the wealthier villains. Only seven settlements in Lindsey had more than 100 taxpayers. In August 1335 the sea broke through the banks off Mablethorpe causing widespread flooding, over two or more days, and drowning sheep and cows and destroying crops. Robert Morley presented one of his relations, named William, to be chaplain of the chantry chapel of St Lawrence at St Mary's Church and he was assigned the task of praying for the souls of the de Malberthorp family, who has probably founded the chantry in 1316.

In 1335 Edward III of England confirmed an agreement whereby Robert Morley was granted permission to exchange the Montalt manor of Mablethorpe for Queens Isabel's manor at Framesdon in Suffolk. The agreement also stated that she acquired rent and services of land held by Elizabeth de Malberthorp and her husband Thomas Fitzwilliam II. Queen Isabel had brought the Montalt Manor to spend time with the Fitzwilliams as they were related to the Plantagenets through the descendants of Henry II of England's half-brother Hamelin de Gatinais.

Legal offices
Preceded by Geoffrey le Scrope	Chief Justice of the King's Bench; 1329–1329	Succeeded by Henry le Scrope
