= William de Shareshull =

English lawyer (died 1370)

Sir William de Shareshull KB
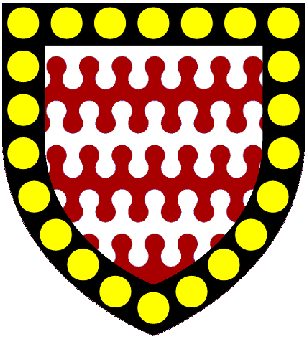
- Arms:Barry nebully of six Argent and Gules a bordure Sable bezanty.

30th Lord Chief Justice of England
- In office 26 October 1350 – 5 July 1361
- Prime Minister: Henry of Grosmont, 1st Duke of Lancaster (as Lord High Steward)
- Chancellor: John of Thoresby (1350-1356); William Edington (1356-1361)
- Preceded by: William de Thorpe
- Succeeded by: Henry Green

Chief Baron of the Exchequer
- In office 2 July 1342 – 10 November 1345
- Monarch: Edward III
- Prime Minister: Henry of Grosmont, 1st Duke of Lancaster (as Lord High Steward)
- Chancellor: Robert Sadington (1344-1345); John de Ufford (1345)
- Succeeded by: John Stowford

Second Justice of the Court of Common Pleas
- In office 10 November 1345 – 26 October 1350
- Monarch: Edward III
- Prime Minister: Henry of Grosmont, 1st Duke of Lancaster (as Lord High Steward)
- Chancellor: John de Ufford (1345-1349); John of Thoresby (1349-1350)

Personal details
- Born: 1289 Shareshill, Staffordshire
- Died: 1370 (aged 80–81)
- Known for: Statute of Labourers; Statute of Treasons

Sir William de Shareshull KB (1289/1290–1370) was an English lawyer and Chief Justice of the King's Bench from 26 October 1350 to 5 July 1361. He achieved prominence under the administration of Edward III of England.

He was responsible for the 1351 Statute of Labourers and Statute of Treasons. He is briefly mentioned in the poem Wynnere and Wastoure, dating from the 1350s.

== Early life ==
Shareshull came from humble Staffordshire origins in the village of Shareshill.

== Career ==
He is mentioned among the advocates in the ‘Year Book’ of Edward II. He received a commission of oyer and terminer on 22 February 1327 and in the two following years. In 1331, when he had risen to the rank of king's serjeant, he was appointed with others to assess a tallage in Oxfordshire, Gloucestershire, and Berkshire (25 June). The following year he was one of the council selected by the king to advise him and was ordered on 11 October to attend the approaching parliament in Scotland for the confirmation of the treaty with Edward Balliol. He was made a Knight of the Bath.

=== Judge ===
On 20 March 1333, he was made a judge of the King's Bench, but was removed to the Common Pleas on 30 May following. He was on assize at York in 1339. On 30 November 1340, Edward III returned from the Low Countries and removed the chancellor, treasurer and other prominent officials, among them Shareshull, on a charge of maladministration.

He was reinstated on 10 May 1342 and on 2 July 1344 he was made Chief Baron of the Exchequer. On 10 November 1345, he was moved back to the Common Pleas, with the title of second justice. He was appointed one of the guardians of the principality of Wales during the minority of the king's son. In 1346 he was styled “councillor and kinsman” of William de Montagu, Earl of Salisbury.

=== Chief judge ===
On 26 October 1350, he was advanced to the headship of the Court of King's Bench and presided over it until 5 July 1357. While holding that office he declared the causes of the meeting of five parliaments, from 25 to 29 Edward III (1351–1355). His functions seem to have more resembled those of a political and parliamentary official than those of a judge.

In 1358 Shareshull, Edward de Montagu, and two others, executors of Elizabeth de Montagu, Countess of Salisbury, sued John Runaway in the Court of Common Pleas regarding a reasonable account of the time he was Elizabeth's bailiff in Worksop, Nottinghamshire and her receiver of money.

In the last year of his chief justiceship, he was excommunicated by the Pope for refusing to appear when summoned to answer for a sentence he had delivered against Thomas Lisle, the Bishop of Ely for harbouring a man who had slain a servant of Blanche, Lady Wake.

In 1344 some sailors thought Shareshull (there called Sharford) stayed too long at dinner when he was holding assizes in that town. One of them mounted the bench and fined the judge for non-attendance. He took such offence at the joke that he induced the king to take away the assizes from the town and took the liberties of the corporation into his own hands for about a year.

=== Retirement ===
Though retired from the bench, he occupied confidential positions as late as 1361. He lived beyond 1364, in which year he granted his manor of Alurynton in Shropshire to Osney Priory, in addition to lands at Sandford in Oxfordshire, which he had given seven years before. He was a benefactor to the priories of Bruera, near Chester and Dudley. He left a son of the same name.

== Notes ==
This article incorporates text from a publication now in the public domain: "Shareshull, William de". Dictionary of National Biography. London: Smith, Elder & Co. 1885–1900.

Legal offices
Preceded by William de Thorpe	Lord Chief Justice; 1350–1361	Succeeded by Henry Green
Preceded by Sir Robert Sadington	Chief Baron of the Exchequer; 1344–1345	Succeeded by Sir John Stowford
