= Edward Saunders (judge) =

English judge

Sir Edward Saunders (died 12 November 1576) was an English judge and Chief Justice of the Queen's Bench.

== Early life and career ==
Sir Edward Saunders was the eldest surviving son of Thomas Saunders (died 1528) of Sibbertoft, Northamptonshire, by Margaret, the daughter of Richard Cave (died 1538) of Stanford, Northamptonshire, and his first wife, Elizabeth Mervin. He had five younger brothers, the lawyer and merchant Robert Saunders (died 1559), Joseph Saunders, the Marian martyr Laurence Saunders (died 1555), and the merchants Blase Saunders (died 1581) and Ambrose Saunders (died 1586), and three sisters, Sabine, wife of the merchant John Johnson, Christian (died 1545), wife of Christopher Breten, and Jane, wife of Clement Villiers.

Saunders is said to have been educated at Cambridge; however there is no evidence that that was the case. He entered the Middle Temple in 1524, and was Lent Reader of his inn 1524–25, double Lent Reader 1532–33, and Autumn Reader 1539. In his early years as a lawyer he was associated with Thomas Cromwell, although never formally in Cromwell's service. He was created serjeant-at-law in Trinity term 1540, and in 1541 was appointed Recorder of Coventry. Saunders became one of the king's Serjeants on 11 February 1547, and was in the commission for the sale of church lands in the town of Northampton. He was successively member of parliament for Coventry (1541), Lostwithiel (1547), and Saltash (1553).

== Judicial career ==
As Recorder of Coventry Saunders instigated the mayor's refusal to obey the orders of the Duke of Northumberland to proclaim Lady Jane Grey as Queen, and advised him to proclaim Mary instead. On her accession Queen Mary granted him an annuity, and appointed him a justice of the common pleas on 4 October 1553. He appears in several special commissions issued in 1553 and 1554 for the trials of Cranmer, Lady Jane Grey, Lords Guilford and Ambrose Dudley, Sir Nicholas Throckmorton, Sir Peter Carew, and others. On 13 February 1554 he was made a justice of common pleas for the county palatine of Lancaster. He was knighted by Philip II on 27 January 1555, two days before his brother Laurence was arraigned for heresy. On 8 May 1557 he was appointed chief justice of the king's bench. In the same month he was head of a special commission for the trial of Thomas Stafford (died 1557) and others on the charge of seizing Scarborough Castle. In 1557 he and Francis Morgan, serjeant-at-law, were granted the manors of Weston under Wetherley in Warwickshire and Newbold in Northamptonshire. On her accession in November 1558 Queen Elizabeth renewed Saunders's patent as chief justice, but on 22 January of the following year she demoted him to chief baron of the exchequer, possibly on account of a quarrel with Dr. Lewis, the judge of the Admiralty court, on a question of jurisdiction. Saunders subsequently acted as a commissioner at the trial of Arthur Pole and Edmund Pole and others (February 1563), and of John Hall and Francis Rolston (May 1572) for treason.

== Death and posterity ==
Sir Edward Saunders died on 12 November 1576, and was buried in the church at Weston under Wetherley, where there is a monument in the east end of the north aisle. His house in Whitefriars, London, abutting on the garden of Serjeant's Inn, was in 1611 sold by his representatives to that society. He married, firstly, Margaret Englefield, the daughter of Sir Thomas Englefield (1488–1537), justice of the court of common pleas, and his wife Elizabeth Throckmorton (died 1543), the daughter of Sir Robert Throckmorton (died 1518) of Coughton. Margaret had earlier been the wife of George Carew (died 1538) of Suffolk. She died on 11 October 1563, and Saunders married secondly, Agnes Hussey, the widow of two husbands, Roger More (died 1551) of Bicester, Serjeant of the Acatry, and Thomas Curzon of Waterperry, a first cousin of Sir Edward Saunders. Saunders' second wife survived him, and died 20 October 1588. There is a memorial to her in the church at Hatfield with verses mentioning her three husbands and children. By his first wife Saunders had an only daughter, Mary, who married Thomas, son of Francis Morgan, the co-grantee of the manors of Weston under Wetherley and Newbold.

== Footnotes ==
Legal offices
Preceded by Sir Clement Higham	Chief Baron of the Exchequer; 1559–1577	Succeeded by Robert Bell
