= David Brooks =

David Brooks may refer to:

== Writers ==
- David Brooks (commentator) (born 1961), commentator for The New York Times and other publications
- David Brooks (author) (born 1953), Australian author of short stories and co-editor of Southerly
- David H. M. Brooks (1950–1996), South African philosopher and professor of philosophy at the University of Cape Town

== Arts ==
- David Brooks (artist) (born 1975), artist based in New York City
- Mavado (singer) (David Constantine Brooks, born 1981), Jamaican dancehall artist
- David Brooks, director of the 2012 film ATM
- Bubba Brooks (David Kenneth Brooks, Jr., 1922–2002), American jazz musician
- David Brooks (actor) (1915–1999), American actor and stage director and producer

== Politics ==
- David Brooks (American politician) (1756–1838), United States representative from New York
- David Brooks, 5th Baron Crawshaw (born 1934), British peer and politician
- David Brooks (Northern Irish politician), MLA from Belfast East
- Sir David Brooks (lord mayor) (1864–1930), lord mayor of Birmingham

== Sports ==
- David Brooks (rugby league) (born 1962), Australian rugby league footballer
- David Brooks (ice hockey) (born 1939), American ice hockey player
- David Brooks (rugby union) (1924–2002), British rugby union footballer
- David Brooks (footballer) (born 1997), Wales international footballer

== Other ==
- David Owen Brooks (1955–2020), teenage accomplice of serial killer Dean Corll
- D. W. Brooks (David William Brooks, 1901–1999), American farmer and businessman
- David Brooks (inventor), inventor who patented an insulator for telegraph lines in 1867 while working for the Central Pacific Railroad

== See also ==
- David Brook (disambiguation)
- David Brooke (disambiguation)
