= Chief Baron of the Exchequer =

Chief judge of the English Exchequer of Pleas

The Chief Baron of the Exchequer was the first "baron" (meaning judge) of the English Exchequer of Pleas. "In the absence of both the Treasurer of the Exchequer or First Lord of the Treasury, and the Chancellor of the Exchequer, it was he who presided in the equity court and answered the bar i.e. spoke for the court." Practically speaking, he held the most important office of the Exchequer of Pleas.

The chief baron, along with the three puisne barons, sat as a court of common law, heard suits in the court of equity and settled revenue disputes. A puisne baron was styled "Mr Baron X" and the chief baron as "Lord Chief Baron X".

From 1550 to 1579, there was a major distinction between the chief baron and the second, third and fourth puisne barons. The difference was in social status and education. All of the chief barons had been trained as lawyers in the Inns of Court. With the exception of Henry Bradshaw and Sir Clement Higham, both barristers-at-law, all of the chief barons who served Queen Elizabeth I, had attained the highest and most prestigious rank of a lawyer, serjeant-at-law.

In 1875, the Court of Exchequer became the Exchequer Division of the High Court. Following the death of the last chief baron in 1880, the division and that of Common Pleas were merged into the King's Bench Division.

== Chief Barons of the Exchequer ==
- 1303 William de Carleton
- 1317 Sir Walter Norwich
- 1327 Hervey de Stanton
- 1328–1329 Sir Walter Norwich
- 1329 Sir John Stonor
- 1331 Sir Henry le Scrope
- 1337 Sir Robert Sadington
- 1344 Sir William de Shareshull
- 1345 Sir John Stowford
- 1345 Sir Robert Sadington
- 1350 Gervase de Wilford
- 1362 William de Skipwith
- 1366 Thomas de Lodelow
- 1375 Sir William Tauk
- 1376 Henry Asty
- 1381 Robert de Plessyngton
- 1384 William de Carleol
- 1386 Sir John Cary (d.1395) of Cockington, Devon.
- 1387 Sir Robert de Plesyngton
- 1388 Thomas Pinchbeck
- 1389 John Cassey
- 1401 Sir John Cokayne, known as the Elder.
- 1414 William Lasingby
- 1420 William Babington
- 1423 Sir John Ivyn
- 1438 John Fray
- 1448 Peter Ardern
- 1463 Richard Illingworth
- 1472 Sir Thomas Urswick
- 1480 Sir William Nottingham
- 1483 Humphrey Starkey
- 1486 Sir William Hody
- 1513 John Scot
- 1522 John FitzJames
- 1526 Sir Richard Broke
- 1529 Sir Richard Lyster
- 1545 Sir Roger Cholmeley
- 1552 Henry Bradshaw
- 1553 David Brooke
- 1558 Sir Clement Higham
- 1559 Sir Edward Saunders
- 1577 Sir Robert Bell
- 1577 Sir John Jefferay, of Chiddingly, Sussex
- 1578 Sir Roger Manwood
- 1593 Sir William Peryam
- 1604 Sir Thomas Fleming
- 1607 Sir Lawrence Tanfield
- 1625 Sir John Walter
- 1631 Sir Humphrey Davenport
- 1645 Sir Richard Lane
- 1648 John Wilde
- 1655 William Steele, appointed Lord Chancellor of Ireland in 1656
- 1658 Sir Thomas Widdrington
- 1660 John Wilde
- 1660 Sir Orlando Bridgeman
- 1660–1671 Sir Matthew Hale
- 1671–1676 Sir Edward Turnor
- 1676–1686 Sir William Montagu
- 1686–1689 Sir Edward Atkyns
- 1689–1694 Sir Robert Atkyns
- 1695–1714 Sir Edward Ward
- 1714–1715 Sir Samuel Dodd
- 1716–1722 Sir Thomas Bury
- 1722–1723 Sir James Montagu
- 1723–1725 Sir Robert Eyre
- 1725–1726 Sir Jeffrey Gilbert
- 1726–1730 Sir Thomas Pengelly
- 1730–1738 Sir James Reynolds, junior
- 1738–1740 Sir John Comyns
- 1740–1742 Sir Edmund Probyn
- 1742–1772 Sir Thomas Parker
- 1772–1777 Sir Sydney Smythe
- 1777–1787 Sir John Skynner
- 1787–1793 Sir James Eyre
- 1793–1813 Sir Archibald Macdonald
- 1813 Sir Vicary Gibbs
- 1814–1817 Sir Alexander Thomson
- 1817–1824 Sir Richard Richards
- 1824–1831 Sir William Alexander
- 1831–1834 John Copley, 1st Baron Lyndhurst
- 1834–1844 Sir James Scarlett
- 1844–1866 Sir Frederick Pollock
- 1866–1880 Sir Fitzroy Kelly

== Peerages created for the Chief Baron of the Exchequer ==
Since the Act of Union 1707
Chief Baron	Title	Created	Current status	Other Judicial Roles
Sir James Scarlett	Baron Abinger	12 January 1835	Extant	None

== See also ==
- Chief Baron of the Court of Exchequer in Scotland
