= Alexander Thomson (Baron of the Exchequer) =

English barrister and judge

Sir Alexander Thomson, PC, FRS (1744? – 15 April 1817) was an English barrister and judge. He was Chief Baron of the Exchequer from 1814 until his death three years later.

== Biography ==
Of unknown parentage, Thomson was born and educated in Wolverhampton. He was entered at Lincoln's Inn in 1764 and called to the Bar in 1769. He practiced in Chancery, mostly as an equity draftsman. He came to the notice of John Russell, 4th Duke of Bedford, who appointed him auditor of his estates.

A close friend of Lord Chancellor Thurlow, Thomson was appointed a Master in Chancery in 1782, Accountant-General in 1786, and a Baron of the Exchequer in 1787; he was made a serjeant and knighted the same year. He had been elected a Bencher of Lincoln's Inn in 1782. In 1786 he was elected FRS.

In 1814, Thomson succeeded Sir Vicary Gibbs as Chief Baron of the Exchequer, and was sworn of the Privy Council. He died 1817. Unmarried and having been predeceased by his sister in whose favour his will was made, his death led to a lawsuit in chancery.

== Arms ==
Coat of arms of Alexander Thomson
Crest A martlet Argent. Escutcheon Per fess Argent and Sable a fess embattled counter-embattled between three martlets counterchanged.
