= Richard de Willoughby =

Member of the Parliament of England

Sir Richard de Willoughby

22nd Lord Chief Justice of England
- In office 28 March 1332 – 20 September 1332
- Monarch: Edward III
- Prime Minister: Henry, 3rd Earl of Lancaster (as Lord High Steward)
- Chancellor: John Stratford
- Preceded by: Geoffrey Scrope
- Succeeded by: Geoffrey Scrope

24th Lord Chief Justice of England
- In office 10 September 1333 – 1337
- Monarch: Edward III
- Prime Minister: Henry, 3rd Earl of Lancaster (as Lord High Steward)
- Chancellor: John Stratford (1333–1334); Richard Bury (1334–1335); John Stratford (1335–1337)
- Preceded by: Geoffrey Scrope
- Succeeded by: Geoffrey Scrope

26th Lord Chief Justice of England
- In office October 1338 – 21 July 1340
- Monarch: Edward III
- Prime Minister: Henry, 3rd Earl of Lancaster (as Lord High Steward)
- Chancellor: Richard Wentworth (1338–1340); John Stratford (1340); Robert Stratford (1340)
- Preceded by: Geoffey Scrope
- Succeeded by: Robert Parning

Personal details
- Born: c. 1290
- Died: 14 March 1362 (aged 71–72)
- Resting place: Willoughby on the Wolds, Nottinghamshire
- Spouse(s): Isabel Mortein; Joan Charron; Elizabeth Vautort
- Parent: Sir Richard Willoughby

Sir Richard de Willoughby (c. 1290 – 14 March 1362) was an English landowner, politician and judge from Nottinghamshire, who was Chief Justice of the King's Bench for three periods between 1332 and 1340.

== Origins ==
Born about 1290, his father was Sir Richard Willoughby, who owned land at Willoughby on the Wolds, Chief Justice of the Irish Common Pleas from 1323 until his death in 1325.

== Career ==
After legal training and shortly before he came into his inheritance, Willoughby represented Nottinghamshire in the Parliament of February 1324. Later that year he was appointed a serjeant-at-law, becoming in 1328 a Justice of the Common Pleas and in 1330 was promoted to the Court of the King's Bench. In 1332, while serving on a judicial commission in the East Midlands, he was kidnapped by the infamous Folville gang and their Coterel allies, who wanted 1300 marks for his release.

Willoughby was notoriously corrupt—the royal yearbooks would later report Willoughby as selling the laws of the land "as if they were cattle or oxen"—and according to the near-contemporary Knighton's Chronicon, the Coterel associates had much to feel aggrieved about. He was able to raise the money and was compensated by the government with an annual payment of 100 marks.

On three occasions he served briefly as Lord Chief Justice during the absence of Geoffrey Scrope. Controversy again surrounded him when on judicial business in 1340 he was besieged for two days at Thurcaston in Leicestershire by another criminal gang. Later that year, as part of King Edward III's purge of the administration, he was demoted to puisne rank, transferred back to the lower court of common pleas and then imprisoned in Corfe Castle in Dorset on charges of corruption. On trial the next year he eventually pleaded guilty and paid a 1200 mark fine, followed by a humiliating circuit round the county courts to answer any local accusations. Whatever faults caused his downfall, he seemed to be forgiven by 1343 when he was reappointed to the common pleas bench, where he served until his retirement in 1357.

In parallel with his judicial career, he actively added to the not inadequate lands his father had left him, primarily in his native Nottinghamshire. In addition, he benefited from lands brought to him in his three marriages, particularly the last. By the time of his death, he had increased his annual income in rents, coming out of nineteen counties, from about 140 pounds in 1325 to over 500 pounds, a massive amount at the time.

He died on 14 March 1362 and was buried in the church of Willoughby on the Wolds in Nottinghamshire, where his monument can still be seen.

== Family ==
In 1310, when he was about 20, he married his first wife Isabel (died 1332), daughter of Sir Roger Mortein, of Dunsby in Lincolnshire, and his wife Isabel, daughter of William Touchet. After her death, in 1333 he married Joan (died 1342), widow of Sir Bertram Monboucher (died 1332) and daughter and sole heiress of Sir Guiscard Charron, of Beamish in County Durham (died 1314). His third wife was Elizabeth (died after 1363), widow of Sir Richard Champernowne (died 1338), of Modbury in Devon, and daughter of Hugh Vautort, of Currypool in Spaxton, Somerset (died 1310).

Legal offices
Preceded by Geoffrey le Scrope	Lord Chief Justice; 1332–1332	Succeeded by Geoffrey le Scrope
Preceded by Geoffrey le Scrope	Lord Chief Justice; 1333–1337	Succeeded by Geoffrey le Scrope
Preceded by Geoffrey le Scrope	Lord Chief Justice; 1338–1340	Succeeded by Robert Parning

Parliament of England
Preceded by	Member of Parliament for Nottinghamshire; 1324; With: Robert de Jorce	Succeeded by
