= Robert Sadington =

Sir Robert Sadington

Lord High Chancellor of England
- In office 29 September 1343 – 26 October 1345
- Monarch: Edward III
- Prime Minister: Henry, 3rd Earl of Lancaster (1343-1345); Henry of Grosmont, 1st Duke of Lancaster (1345) (as Lord High Stewards)
- Preceded by: Robert Parning
- Succeeded by: John de Ufford

Lord High Treasurer
- In office 2 May 1340 – 21 June 1340
- Monarch: Edward III
- Prime Minister: Henry, 3rd Earl of Lancaster (as Lord High Steward)
- Chancellor: Robert de Stratford
- Preceded by: William Zouche
- Succeeded by: Robert Wodehouse

Chief Baron of the Exchequer
- In office 20 March 1337 – 29 September 1343
- Monarch: Edward III
- Prime Minister: Henry, 3rd Earl of Lancaster (as Lord High Steward)
- Chancellor: John de Stratford (1334); Richard Bury (1334-1335); John de Stratford (1335-1337); Robert de Stratford (1337-1338); Richard Bintworth (1338-1339); John de Stratford (1340)
- In office 8 December 1345 – 1349
- Monarch: Edward III
- Prime Minister: Henry of Grosmont, 1st Duke of Lancaster (as Lord High Steward)
- Chancellor: John de Ufford

Personal details
- Born: Saddington, Leicestershire
- Spouse: Joyce de Mortival
- Children: Isabel Hastings
- Parent: John de Sadington (father)

Sir Robert Sadington (fl. 1340) was Lord Chancellor of England.

== Life ==
He is assumed to be a native of Saddington in Leicestershire, and perhaps a son of John de Sadington, a valet of Isabella of France. He appears as an advocate in the year-books from 1329 to 1336. On 12 February 1332, he was placed on the commission of peace for Leicestershire and Rutland, and on 25 June 1332 was a commissioner for the assessment of the tallage in the counties of Leicester, Warwick, and Worcester. Previously to 8 August 1334 he was justice in eyre of the forest of Pickering and of the forests in Lancashire.

During 1336, he was a justice of gaol delivery at Lancaster and Warwick. On 20 March 1337 he was appointed Chief Baron of the Exchequer, and appears to have been the first chief baron who was summoned to parliament by that title. On 25 July 1339 he was acting as lieutenant for the treasurer, William de Zouche, and from 2 May to 21 June 1340 was himself treasurer, but retained his office as chief baron. On 29 September 1343 he was appointed chancellor, being the third layman to hold this position during the reign. He resigned the great seal on 26 October 1345. The reason for his resignation is not given, but he was reappointed chief baron on 8 December 1345. He had been a trier of petitions for England in the parliaments of 1341 and 1343, and was a trier of petitions from the clergy in 1347. In 1346, Sadington was one of the guardians of the principality of Wales, duchy of Cornwall, and earldom of Chester during the minority of Edward, the Black Prince. In 1347, he presided over the commission appointed to try the earls of Fife and Menteith, who had been taken prisoners in the battle of Neville's Cross.

His successor as chief baron was appointed on 7 April 1350, Sadington having been given leave to retire in 1349. He married Joyce, sister and heiress of Roger de Mortival, bishop of Salisbury. Isabel, his daughter and sole heir, married Sir Ralph Hastings.

== Notes ==
Legal offices
Preceded by Sir Henry le Scrope	Chief Baron of the Exchequer; 1337–1343	Succeeded by Sir William de Shareshull
Preceded by Sir John Stowford	Chief Baron of the Exchequer; 1346–1350	Succeeded by Gervase de Wilford
