= Lord Chief Justice of England and Wales =

Head of the judiciary of England and Wales

Lady Chief Justice of England and Wales
- The Judiciary of England and Wales

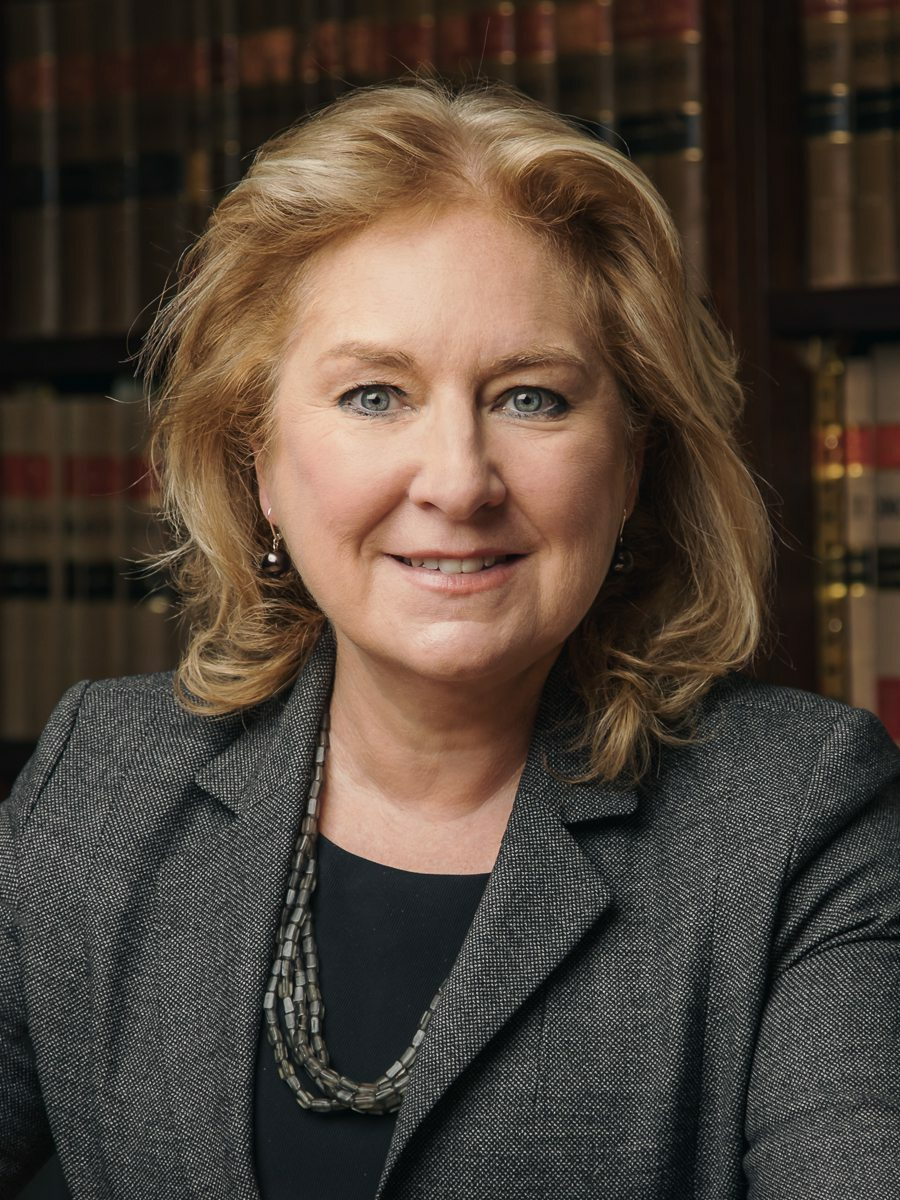
- Incumbent; The Baroness Carr of Walton-on-the-Hill since 1 October 2023
- Judiciary of England and Wales
- Style: The Right Honourable
- Nominator: Judicial Appointments Commission
- Appointer: Monarch of the United Kingdom, on the recommendation of the Prime Minister and Lord Chancellor
- Term length: Mandatory retirement at age 75
- Formation: 29 November 1880
- Deputy: Master of the Rolls
- Salary: £294,821
- Website: https://www.judiciary.uk/about-the-judiciary/lord-chief-justice/

The lord or lady chief justice of England and Wales is the head of the judiciary of England and Wales and the president of the courts of England and Wales.

Until 2005, the lord chief justice was the second-most senior judge of the English and Welsh courts, surpassed by the lord chancellor, who normally sat in the highest court. The Constitutional Reform Act 2005 changed the roles of judges, creating the position of president of the Supreme Court of the United Kingdom and altering the duties of the lord chief justice and the lord chancellor. The lord chief justice ordinarily serves as president of the Criminal Division of the Court of Appeal and head of criminal justice, meaning its technical processes within the legal domain, but under the 2005 Act can appoint another judge to these positions. The lord chancellor became a purely executive office, with no judicial role.

The equivalent in Scotland is the lord president of the Court of Session, who also holds the post of Lord Justice-General in the High Court of Justiciary. The equivalent in Northern Ireland is the lord chief justice of Northern Ireland, local successor to the lord chief justice of Ireland of the pre-Partition era.

Sue Carr, Baroness Carr of Walton-on-the-Hill, has been Lady Chief Justice since October 2023. She is the first female holder of the office.

== History ==
Originally, each of the three high common law courts, the King's Bench, the Court of Common Pleas, and the Court of the Exchequer, had its own chief justice: the Lord Chief Justice, the Chief Justice of the Common Pleas, and the Chief Baron of the Exchequer. The Court of the King's (or Queen's) Bench had existed since 1234. In 1268 the first chief justice of the King's Bench was appointed. From the time of Edward Coke in the early 17th century, the chief justice became known informally as "lord chief justice". It was only in 1875 that it became the statutory title.

The three courts became divisions of the High Court in 1875 (though the head of each court continued in post). Following the deaths of Lord Chief Justice Sir Alexander Cockburn and Chief Baron Sir Fitzroy Kelly in 1880, the three divisions were merged into a single division, with Lord Coleridge, the last Chief Justice of Common Pleas, as Lord Chief Justice of England.

The suffix "and Wales", now found in statutes and elsewhere, was first appended to the title by Lord Bingham of Cornhill in 1998.

=== Constitutional Reform Act 2005 ===
The Constitutional Reform Act 2005 (CRA) made the Lord Chief Justice the president of the Courts of England and Wales, vesting the office with many of the powers formerly held by the Lord Chancellor. While the Lord Chief Justice retains the role of President of the Criminal Division of the Court of Appeal, the CRA separated the role of President of the King's Bench Division; the changed chief justice role was first held by Lord Phillips of Worth Matravers. The CRA provides that the chief justice is chosen by a specially appointed committee convened by the Judicial Appointments Commission.

=== Modification of title from Lord to Lady ===
Upon the announcement of the appointment on 15 June 2023 of Dame Sue Carr, it was highly anticipated that the title would be modified from Lord to Lady, in line with Dame Siobhan Keegan's 2021 appointment as Lady Chief Justice of Northern Ireland. This speculation was further confirmed in news closer to Carr's appointment, on 27 September 2023 that Carr had chosen the title of Lady Chief Justice. When Carr took office she was sworn as Lady Chief Justice, for the first time in the role's history since its inception.

== Roles and responsibilities ==
The lord chief justice has more than 400 individual statutory responsibilities specified in the Constitutional Reform Act 2005. While they sit as a judge on important criminal, civil and family cases, including appeal cases, they also have a wide range of administrative responsibilities. As president of the Courts of England and Wales, they are responsible for representing the opinions of the judiciary to government, overseeing their welfare and training and allocating work amongst them. With the Lord Chancellor, they are responsible for the handling of complaints against judges through the Judicial Conduct Investigations Office. They are also president of the Sentencing Council and Magistrates' Association, and chair the Judicial Executive Board and Judges' Council.

== Lord chief justices of the King's (Queen's) Bench, to 1880 ==
Portrait	Lord chief justice	From	Until	Notes
	William de Raley	1234	1239	
	Sir Stephen de Segrave	1239	1241	
	William of York	1241	1247	
	Henry of Bath	1249	1251	
	Sir Gilbert of Seagrave	1251	1253	
	Henry of Bath	1253	1260	
	Sir William of Wilton	1261	1263	
	Nicholas de Turri	1265	1267	
	Sir Robert de Briwes	1268	6 November 1269	
	Richard of Staines	6 November 1269	1273	
	Martin of Littlebury	1273	1274	
	Ralph de Hengham	1274	1290	
	Gilbert de Thornton	1290	1296	
	Sir Roger Brabazon	1296	March 1316	
	Sir William Inge	March 1316	15 June 1317	
	Sir Henry le Scrope	15 June 1317	September 1323	
	Hervey de Stanton	September 1323	21 March 1324	
	Sir Geoffrey le Scrope	21 March 1324	1 May 1329	
	Sir Robert de Malberthorp	1 May 1329	28 October 1329	
	Sir Henry le Scrope	28 October 1329	19 December 1330	
	Sir Geoffrey le Scrope	19 December 1330	28 March 1332	
	Sir Richard de Willoughby	28 March 1332	20 September 1332	
	Sir Geoffrey le Scrope	20 September 1332	10 September 1333	
	Sir Richard de Willoughby	10 September 1333	1337	
	Sir Geoffrey le Scrope	1337	October 1338	
	Sir Richard de Willoughby	October 1338	21 July 1340	
	Sir Robert Parning	21 July 1340	8 January 1341	
	Sir William Scott	8 January 1341	26 November 1346	
	Sir William de Thorpe	26 November 1346	26 October 1350	
	Sir William de Shareshull	26 October 1350	24 May 1361	
	Sir Henry Green	24 May 1361	29 October 1365	
	Sir John Knyvet	29 October 1365	15 July 1372	
	Sir John de Cavendish	15 July 1372	14 June 1381	Murdered in the Peasants' Revolt
	Sir Robert Tresilian	22 June 1381	17 November 1387	
	Sir Walter Clopton	31 January 1388	21 October 1400	
	Sir William Gascoigne	15 November 1400	29 March 1413	
	Sir William Hankford	29 March 1413	12 December 1423	
	Sir William Cheyne	21 January 1424	20 January 1439	
	Sir John Juyn	20 January 1439	24 March 1440	
	Sir John Hody	13 April 1440	25 January 1442	
	Sir John Fortescue	25 January 1442	13 May 1461	
	Sir John Markham	13 May 1461	23 January 1469	
	Sir Thomas Billing	23 January 1469	5 May 1481	
	Sir William Hussey	7 May 1481	8 September 1495	
	Sir John Fineux	24 November 1495	23 January 1526	
	Sir John FitzJames	23 January 1526	21 January 1539	
	Sir Edward Montagu	21 January 1539	9 November 1545	
	Sir Richard Lyster	9 November 1545	21 March 1552	
	Sir Roger Cholmeley	21 March 1552	4 October 1553	
	Sir Thomas Bromley	4 October 1553	11 June 1555	
	Sir William Portman	11 June 1555	8 May 1557	
	Sir Edward Saunders	8 May 1557	22 January 1559	
	Sir Robert Catlyn	22 January 1559	8 November 1574	
	Sir Christopher Wray	8 November 1574	2 June 1592	
	Sir John Popham	2 June 1592	25 June 1607	
	Sir Thomas Fleming	25 June 1607	25 October 1613	
	Sir Edward Coke	25 October 1613	16 November 1616	
	Sir Henry Montagu	16 November 1616	29 January 1621	
	Sir James Ley	29 January 1621	26 January 1625	
	Sir Ranulph Crewe	26 January 1625	5 February 1627	
	Sir Nicholas Hyde	5 February 1627	24 October 1631	
	Sir Thomas Richardson	24 October 1631	4 February 1635^{†}	Died in office
	Sir John Bramston	14 April 1635	31 October 1642	
	Sir Robert Heath	31 October 1642	October 1645	
	Sir Henry Rolle	12 October 1648	15 June 1655	
	John Glynne	15 June 1655	17 January 1660	Knighted in 1660
	Sir Richard Newdigate	17 January 1660	1 October 1660	
	Sir Robert Foster	21 October 1660	4 October 1663^{†}	First Chief Justice after the Restoration; died in office
	Sir Robert Hyde	19 October 1663	1 May 1665^{†}	Died in office
	Sir John Kelynge	21 November 1665	9 May 1671^{†}	Died in office
	Sir Matthew Hale	18 May 1671	20 February 1676	Formerly Lord Chief Baron of the Exchequer 1660–1671
	Sir Richard Raynsford	12 April 1676	31 May 1678	
	Sir William Scroggs	31 May 1678	11 April 1681	
	Sir Francis Pemberton	11 April 1681	1682	Later Chief Justice of the Common Pleas in 1683
	Sir Edmund Saunders	23 January 1683	19 June 1683	Died in office
	Sir George Jeffreys (Baron Jeffreys from 1685)	28 September 1683	23 October 1685	Lord Chancellor 1685–1688
	Sir Edward Herbert	23 October 1685	22 April 1687	Later Chief Justice of the Common Pleas 1687–1689
	Sir Robert Wright	22 April 1687	17 April 1689	Briefly Chief Justice of the Common Pleas in April 1687
	Sir John Holt	17 April 1689	5 March 1710^{†}	Died in office
	Sir Thomas Parker (Lord Parker from 1714)	11 March 1710	15 May 1718	Regent of Great Britain from 1 August to 18 September 1714; later Lord Chancellor 1718–1725, created Earl of Macclesfield in 1721; impeached for corruption in 1725
	Sir John Pratt	15 May 1718	24 February 1725	Interim Chancellor of the Exchequer in 1721
	Sir Robert Raymond (Baron Raymond from 1731)	2 March 1725	31 October 1733^{†}	Previously Attorney General 1720–1724; died in office
	Philip Yorke, 1st Baron Hardwicke	31 October 1733	8 June 1737	Previously Attorney General 1724–1733; later Lord Chancellor 1737–1756 and created Earl of Hardwicke in 1754
	Sir William Lee	8 June 1737	8 April 1754^{†}	Interim Chancellor of the Exchequer in 1754; died in office
	Sir Dudley Ryder	2 May 1754	25 May 1756^{†}	Previously Attorney General 1737–1754; died in office
	William Murray, 1st Baron Mansfield (Earl of Mansfield from 1776)	8 November 1756	4 June 1788	Previously Attorney General 1754–1756; Lord Speaker in 1783
	Lloyd Kenyon, 1st Baron Kenyon	4 June 1788	4 April 1802^{†}	Previously Attorney General 1782–1783 1783–1784 and Master of the Rolls 1784–1788; died in office
	Edward Law, 1st Baron Ellenborough	11 April 1802	2 November 1818	Previously Attorney General 1801–1802; interim Chancellor of the Exchequer in 1806
	Sir Charles Abbott (Baron Tenterden from 1827)	2 November 1818	4 November 1832^{†}	Interim Chancellor of the Exchequer in 1827; died in office
	Sir Thomas Denman (Baron Denman from 1834)	4 November 1832	5 March 1850	Previously Attorney General 1830–1832; interim Chancellor of the Exchequer in 1834
	John Campbell, 1st Baron Campbell	5 March 1850	24 June 1859	Previously Attorney General 1834 and 1835–1841; briefly Lord Chancellor of Ireland in 1841; later Lord Chancellor 1859–1861
	Sir Alexander Cockburn, 12th Baronet	24 June 1859	20 November 1880^{†}	Previously Attorney General 1851–1852, 1852–1856 and Chief Justice of the Common Pleas 1856–1859; Courts of the Queen's Bench, Common Pleas, and Exchequer became divisions of a unified High Court in 1875; died in office

== Lord (or Lady) chief justices of England (later England and Wales) 1880–present ==
Portrait	Lord chief justice	From	Until	Notes
	John Coleridge, 1st Baron Coleridge	29 November 1880	14 June 1894^{†}	Previously Attorney General 1871–1873 and Chief Justice of the Common Pleas 1873–1880; died in office
	Charles Russell, Baron Russell of Killowen	11 July 1894	10 August 1900^{†}	Previously Attorney General 1886 1892–1894 and a law lord in 1894; first Catholic Lord Chief Justice; died in office
	Richard Webster, 1st Baron Alverstone	24 October 1900	21 October 1913	Previously Attorney-General 1885–1886 1886–1892 1895–1900 and Master of the Rolls in 1900; in retirement, created Viscount Alverstone in 1913
	Sir Rufus Isaacs (Baron Reading from 1914, Viscount Reading from 1916, Earl of Reading from 1917)	21 October 1913	8 March 1921	Previously Attorney General 1910–1913; later Viceroy of India 1921–1925 and created Marquess of Reading in 1926; first Jewish Lord Chief Justice
	Sir Alfred Lawrence (Baron Trevethin from August 1921)	15 April 1921	2 March 1922	
	Sir Gordon Hewart (Baron Hewart from 24 March 1922)	8 March 1922	12 October 1940	Previously Attorney General 1919–1922; in retirement, created Viscount Hewart in 1940
	Thomas Inskip, 1st Viscount Caldecote	14 October 1940	23 January 1946	Previously Attorney General 1928–1929 and 1932–1936 and Lord Chancellor 1939–1940
	Rayner Goddard, Baron Goddard	23 January 1946	29 September 1958	Previously a law lord from 1944
	Hubert Parker, Baron Parker of Waddington	29 September 1958	20 April 1971	
	John Widgery, Baron Widgery	20 April 1971	15 April 1980	
	Geoffrey Lane, Baron Lane	15 April 1980	27 April 1992	Previously a law lord from 1979
	Peter Taylor, Baron Taylor of Gosforth	27 April 1992	4 June 1996	
	Thomas Bingham, Baron Bingham of Cornhill	4 June 1996	6 June 2000	First Lord Chief Justice of England and Wales; Master of the Rolls 1992–1996; Senior Law Lord 2000–2008
	Harry Woolf, Baron Woolf	6 June 2000	30 September 2005	Previously a law lord from 1992; Master of the Rolls from 1996 to 2000
	Nick Phillips, Baron Phillips of Worth Matravers	30 September 2005	1 October 2008	Previously a law lord from 1999; Master of the Rolls 2000–2005; later Senior Law Lord 2008–2009 and President of the Supreme Court 2009–2012
	Igor Judge, Baron Judge	1 October 2008	30 September 2013	Previously Deputy Chief Justice of England and Wales 2003–2005
	John Thomas, Baron Thomas of Cwmgiedd	1 October 2013	1 October 2017	
	Ian Burnett, Baron Burnett of Maldon	2 October 2017	30 September 2023	
	Sue Carr, Baroness Carr of Walton-on-the-Hill	1 October 2023	Incumbent	The first Lady Chief Justice since the role's inception in the 13th century.

== Hereditary peerages created for the Lord Chief Justice ==
- Thomas Parker, 1st Earl of Macclesfield/Baron Parker – extant
- Robert Raymond, 1st Baron Raymond – extinct 1756
- Philip Yorke, 1st Earl of Hardwicke/Baron Hardwicke – extant
- William Murray, 1st Earl of Mansfield/Earl of Mansfield/Baron Mansfield – extant
- Lloyd Kenyon, 1st Baron Kenyon – extant
- Edward Law, 1st Baron Ellenborough – extant
- Charles Abbott, 1st Baron Tenterden – extinct 1939
- Thomas Denman, 1st Baron Denman – extant
- Rufus Isaacs, 1st Earl of Reading/Viscount Reading/Baron Reading – extant, held by the Marquess of Reading
- Alfred Lawrence, 1st Baron Trevethin – extant, held by the Baron Trevethin and Oaksey
- Gordon Hewart, 1st Baron Hewart – extinct 1964

== See also ==
- Category:Lord chief justices of England and Wales
- Category:English judges
- Category:Judges of the Court of Appeal (England and Wales)
- Master of the Rolls
