= David Broke =

English judge and Member of Parliament

David Brook (c. 1498–1560) (also Brooke or Broke) was an English judge and Member of Parliament.

== Life ==
He was of a West country family living at Glastonbury, Somerset. His father, John Brook, was also a lawyer and serjeant-at-law; he died in 1525, and was buried in the church of St. Mary Redcliffe, Bristol, having been principal seneschal of the neighbouring monastery. David was appointed reader at the Inner Temple in the autumn of 1534, and again in Lent term 1540, when he was also treasurer, and in 1541 he became governor. He was recorder of Bristol (1541–1549) and M.P. for the city (1542–1544).

On 3 February 1547, the first week of Edward VI's reign, he received the coif, the degree of serjeant-at-law having been bestowed on him as one of the last acts of Henry VIII. On 25 November 1551 he was appointed king's serjeant, and when, two years later (1 September 1553), Sir Henry Bradshaw was removed, he succeeded him as lord chief baron of the exchequer. On 2 October, the day after Queen Mary's coronation, Brook and others, according to Henry Machyn, were dubbed knights of the carpet.

Notices of his judgments continue to occur in James Dyer's reports until Hilary term 1557–58. In March he was succeeded by Sir Clement Heigham. He is said to have been fond of the maxim, 'Never do anything by another that you can do by yourself'.

== Family ==
He was twice married: first to Katherine, daughter of Giles Brugge, 6th Baron Chandos, who was the widow of Leonard Poole (d.1538); secondly, to Margaret, daughter of Richard Butler of London, who had already survived two husbands, Andrew Fraunces and Alderman Robert Chertsey, and, surviving Broke, married Edward North, 1st Baron North, and was buried in the chancel of the church of St. Lawrence Jewry, London. By neither wife had he any issue.

Legal offices
Preceded by Henry Bradshaw	Chief Baron of the Exchequer; 1553–1558	Succeeded by Sir Clement Higham
