= Laurence Saunders =

English Protestant clergyman and martyr

Laurence Saunders (1519 – 8 February 1555) was an English Protestant martyr whose story is recorded in Foxe's Book of Martyrs.

== Early life ==
Saunders was the son of Thomas Saunders (d. 1528) of Sibbertoft, Northamptonshire, by Margaret, the daughter of Richard Cave (d. 1538) of Stanford, Northamptonshire, and his first wife, Elizabeth Mervin. He had five brothers, the judge Sir Edward Saunders (d.1576), the lawyer and merchant Robert Saunders (d.1559), Joseph Saunders, and the merchants Blase Saunders (d.1581) and Ambrose Saunders (d.1586), and three sisters, Sabine, wife of the merchant John Johnson, Christian (d.1545), wife of Christopher Breten, and Jane, wife of Clement Villiers.

Saunders was educated at Eton and at King's College, Cambridge. After graduating BA in 1541 he was apprenticed to Sir William Chester, but soon abandoned mercantile pursuits and continued his studies, proceeding MA in 1544 and obtaining a doctorate in theology. In the early years of the reign of Edward VI he obtained a licence to preach. Being a man of much ability he was very popular, and was appointed reader at Fotheringhay and later at Lichfield Cathedral. In 1553 he was granted the living at All Hallows Bread Street in London where George Marsh was his curate.

While at Lichfield, Saunders had married a woman named Joanna, by whom he had a son, Samuel. After her husband's death Joanna left England in the company of Robert and Lucy Harrington. Lucy Harrington died shortly thereafter, and by 18 June 1556 Joanna had married Robert Harrington.

== Trial and death ==
On 15 October 1553 he preached at Northampton, warning the congregation that 'the errors of the popish religion' would be restored to the church by Queen Mary I and that England was threatened with the visitation of God for her 'lukewarm indifference in the cause of Christ, and the privileges of his glorious gospel'. In October 1554 he was arrested by the order of the bishop of London after having given a sermon at All Hallows, Bread Street. After three months imprisonment he was arraigned on 29 January 1555, and convicted of heresy. He was taken to Coventry, and burned at the stake on 8 February 1555. Before being chained to the stake, he kissed it, saying, 'Welcome the cross of Christ, welcome everlasting life!' The martyrdom of Saunders was said to have been the start of Joyce Lewis's conversion and her later martyrdom.

== See also ==
- Marian Persecutions
- Coventry Martyrs
