= John de Ufford =

Archbishop-elect of Canterbury and Chancellor of England (died 1349)

- Archbishop-designate of Canterbury
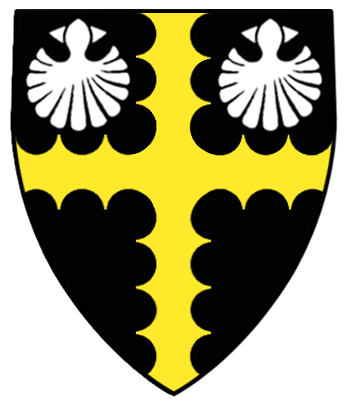
- Term ended: 20 May 1349
- Predecessor: John de Stratford (archbishop)
- Successor: Thomas Bradwardine (archbishop)
- Previous posts: Lord Privy Seal, Dean of Lincoln

Orders
- Consecration: (died unconsecrated)

Personal details
- Died: 20 May 1349
- Denomination: Roman Catholic

John de Ufford (Note: Sometimes John de Offord or John Offord) (died 20 May 1349) was chancellor and head of the royal administration to Edward III as well as being appointed to the Archbishopric of Canterbury.

== Early life ==
His family held the estate of Offord Dameys, Huntingdonshire. His brother was Andrew Offord.

== Career ==
De Ufford was sent, along with Nicholas de Luna and Hugh Neville to Avignon in the summer of 1344 as envoys to a council held by Pope Clement VI to mediate peace during the Peace of Malestroit (January 1343 – September 1346), a breathing space for both sides during the Hundred Years War. The mediation came to naught.

De Ufford was the chancellor to Edward III, keeper of both the great seal and the privy seal. He was entrusted with the privy seal in 1342 (thus becoming Lord Privy Seal), and the great seal on 26 October 1345, which was the duty of the Lord Chancellor. He resigned the office of Lord Privy Seal after 29 September 1344, but held the office of Chancellor until his death.

De Ufford held the position of Dean of Lincoln from 1344 to 1348.

== Archbishop of Canterbury ==
After the death of Archbishop John de Stratford, Edward chose de Ufford as Archbishop of Canterbury, though the canons of the chapter had elected Thomas Bradwardine, the king's trusted confessor, a great intellectual and diplomat. De Ufford was appointed to the see of Canterbury by papal bull dated 24 September 1348 and was granted the temporalities of the see on 14 December 1348.

== Death and afterward ==
Any developing contention between the chapter and the king was rendered a dead issue when de Ufford, already aged and infirm, was carried off by the Black Death, before being consecrated, on 20 May 1349.

== Citations ==
Political offices
| Preceded by William Kilsby | Lord Privy Seal; 1342–1344 | Succeeded by Thomas Hatfield |
| Preceded by Sir Robert Sadington | Lord Chancellor; 1345–1349 | Succeeded by John Thoresby |
Catholic Church titles
| Preceded by William Bateman | Dean of Lincoln; 1344–1348 | Succeeded by Thomas Bradwardine |
| Preceded by John de Stratford (archbishop) | Archbishop-designate of Canterbury; 1348–1349 | Succeeded by Thomas Bradwardine (archbishop) |
