= List of Privy Counsellors (1714–1820) =

This is a list of privy counsellors of the Kingdom of Great Britain and the United Kingdom appointed between the accession of King George I in 1714 and the death of King George III in 1820.

== George I, 1714–1727 ==
=== 1714 ===
- James Lowther (1673–1755)
- George Augustus, Prince of Wales (1683–1760)
- Sir William Dawes, Bt (1671–1724)
- James Stanhope (c.1673–1721)
- Robert Walpole (1676–1745)
- Hugh Boscawen (c.1680–1734)
- The Earl of Stair (1673–1747)
- Paul Methuen (c.1672–1757)
- The Earl of Dorset (1688–1765)
- The Earl of Uxbridge (1663–1743)
- The Lord Carleton (1669–1725)

=== 1715 ===
- Sir Peter King (c.1669–1734)
- The Duke of Grafton (1683–1757)
- The Earl of Galway (1648–1720)
- The Earl of Derby (1664–1736)
- The Earl of Lincoln (1684–1728)

=== 1716 ===
- William Wake (1657–1737)
- The Earl of Tankerville (1674–1722)
- The Lord Cobham (1675–1749)
- The Hon. Spencer Compton (1673–1743)
- William Pulteney (1684–1764) (expelled 1731; re-admitted 1742)
- John Aislabie (1670–1742)

=== 1717 ===
- John Smith (1656–1723)
- The Lord Torrington (c.1655–1719)
- The Lord Cadogan (c.1671–1726)
- The Duke of Newcastle (1693–1768)
- The Earl of Westmorland (1681–1736)
- The Earl of Berkeley (c.1679–1736)
- Joseph Addison (1672–1719)
- Sir Joseph Jekyll (1663–1738)
- The Earl of Halifax (c.1684–1739)

=== 1718 ===
- The Earl of Holderness (1681–1721)
- James Craggs the Younger (1686–1721)
- Richard Hampden (c.1674–1728)
- Nicholas Lechmere (1675–1727)
- Sir John Pratt (1657–1725)

=== 1719 ===
- Charles Wills (1666–1741)

=== 1720 ===
- The Earl of Coventry (c.1676–1751)

=== 1721 ===
- The Earl of Sutherland (1661–1733)
- Sir George Byng, Bt (1663–1733)
- The Lord Carteret (1690–1763)
- The Duke of Chandos (1673–1744)
- The Earl of Portmore (1656–1730)
- The Lord Cornwallis (1675–1722)

=== 1722 ===
- Sir Robert Sutton (1671–1746)

=== 1723 ===
- The Earl of Godolphin (1678–1766)
- Edmund Gibson (1669–1748)
- The Earl of Findlater (1664–1730)

=== 1724 ===
- The Duke of Ancaster and Kesteven (1686–1742)
- Lancelot Blackburne (1658–1743)

=== 1725 ===
- Sir Robert Raymond (1673–1733)
- The Duke of Bolton (1685–1754)
- Lord Finch (1689–1769)
- Sir Robert Eyre (1666–1735)
- The Hon. Henry Pelham (1694–1754)

=== 1726 ===
- The Lord Trevor (1658–1730)
- The Duke of Queensberry (1698–1778)
- The Earl of Marchmont (1675–1740)
- The Viscount Lonsdale (1694–1751)

=== 1727 ===
- The Earl of Chesterfield (1694–1773)
- William Stanhope (c. 1683–1756)

== George II, 1727–1760 ==
=== 1727 ===
- The Earl of Scarbrough (1686–1739)
- The Earl of Grantham (1673–1754)
- The Earl of Sussex (1690–1731)

=== 1728 ===
- Arthur Onslow (1691–1768)
- Frederick, Prince of Wales (1707–1751)

=== 1729 ===
- The Earl of Burlington (1694–1753)

=== 1730 ===
- The Lord Hervey (1696–1743)
- The Lord Bingley (c. 1676–1731)
- The Hon. Sir Conyers Darcy (c. 1685–1758)
- Sir William Strickland, Bt (c. 1686–1735)
- Horatio Walpole (1678–1757)

=== 1731 ===
- The Duke of Devonshire (1698–1755)
- The Lord De La Warr (1693–1766)
- The Earl of Leicester (1680–1737)

=== 1732 ===
- Sir Charles Wager (1666–1743)
- The Hon. Pattee Byng (1699–1747)

=== 1733 ===
- The Duke of Atholl (1690–1764)
- The Earl of Selkirk (1663–1739)
- Sir Philip Yorke (1690–1764)
- Charles Talbot (1685–1737)

=== 1734 ===
- The Duke of Richmond (1701–1750)
- The Earl of Pembroke (1693–1749)
- The Earl of Essex (1697–1743)
- The Earl Waldegrave (1684–1741)
- Stephen Poyntz (1685–1750)

=== 1735 ===
- The Duke of Montagu (1690–1749)
- Sir Thomas Reeve (1673–1737)
- The Earl FitzWalter (1672–1756)
- Sir William Yonge, Bt (c.1693–1755)

=== 1736 ===
- John Potter (c.1674–1747)
- Sir John Willes (1685–1761)
- The Earl of Cholmondeley (1703–1770)

=== 1737 ===
- The Lord Monson (1693–1748)
- Sir William Lee (1688–1754)

=== 1738 ===
- The Earl of Abercorn (1686–1744)
- John Verney (1699–1741)

=== 1739 ===
- Sir John Norris (c.1670–1749)

=== 1740 ===
- Lord Sidney Beauclerk (1703–1744)
- The Lord Cornwallis (1700–1762)

=== 1741 ===
- Thomas Winnington (1696–1746)
- William Fortescue (1687–1749)

=== 1742 ===
- The Marquess of Tweeddale (1695–1762)
- Samuel Sandys (1695–1770)
- The Duke of Ancaster and Kesteven (1714–1778)
- William Pulteney (1684–1764)
- The Duke of Cumberland (1721–1765)
- George Wade (1673–1748)
- Thomas Clutterbuck (1697–1742)
- The Lord Gower (1694–1754)
- The Lord Bathurst (1684–1775)
- The Hon. William Finch (1691–1766)

=== 1743 ===
- Sir John Rushout, Bt (1685–1775)
- Thomas Herring (1693–1757)

=== 1744 ===
- The Lord Hobart (1693–1756)
- George Dodington (1691–1762)
- The Lord Edgcumbe (1680–1758)
- The Duke of Bedford (1710–1771)

=== 1745 ===
–

=== 1746 ===
- The Earl of Jersey (d. 1769)
- William Pitt the Elder (1708–1778)
- Henry Fox (1705–1774)

=== 1747 ===
- Matthew Hutton (1693–1758)

=== 1748 ===
- The Earl of Halifax (1716–1771)
- Thomas Sherlock (1678–1761)
- The Earl of Sandwich (1718–1792)
- Sir John Ligonier (1680–1770)

=== 1749 ===
- Sir John Strange (1696–1754)
- The Duke of Marlborough (1706–1758)
- The Hon. Henry Legge (1708–1764)

=== 1750 ===
- The Earl of Hyndford (1701–1767)
- The Lord Anson (1697–1762)
- Sir Thomas Robinson (1695–1770)

=== 1751 ===
- The Earl Harcourt (1714–1777)
- The Earl of Holderness (1718–1778)
- Marquess of Hartington (1720–1764)
- The Earl of Albemarle (1702–1754)

=== 1752 ===
- The Lord Berkeley of Stratton (1697–1773)
- Sir George Lee (c.1700–1758)
- The Earl Waldegrave (1715–1763)

=== 1754 ===
- The Earl of Hillsborough (1718–1793)
- George Grenville (1712–1770)
- Sir Dudley Ryder (1691–1756)
- Sir Thomas Clarke (1703–1764)
- Sir George Lyttelton, Bt (1709–1773)

=== 1755 ===
- The Duke of Bolton (1691–1759)
- The Earl of Egmont (1711–1770)
- The Earl of Rochford (1717–1781)
- The Viscount Barrington (1717–1793)
- The Earl Gower (1721–1806)

=== 1756 ===
- Lord Hobart (1723–1793)
- The Lord Raymond (1717–1756)
- The Earl Temple (1711–1779)
- The Viscount Bateman (1721–1802)
- The Lord Mansfield (1705–1793)
- The Hon. Richard Edgcumbe (1716–1761)
- The Viscount Falmouth (1707–1782)

=== 1757 ===
- The Duke of Leeds (1713–1789)
- The Hon. Charles Townshend (1725–1767)
- John Gilbert (1693–1761)
- Sir Robert Henley (1708–1772)
- The Earl of Thomond (c.1713–1774)

=== 1758 ===
- Lord George Sackville (1716–1785) (expelled 1760; readmitted 1765)
- Viscount Dupplin (1710–1787)
- Thomas Secker (1693–1768)
- The Marquess of Winchester (c.1718–1765)

=== 1759 ===
- The Hon. Edward Boscawen (1711–1761)
- Robert Nugent (1709–1788)

=== 1760 ===
- The Earl of Denbigh (1719–1800)
- Welbore Ellis (1713–1802)

== George III, 1760–1820 ==
=== 1760 ===
- Prince Edward, Duke of York (1739–1767)
- The Earl of Bute (1713–1792)
- The Earl of Huntingdon (1728–1789)
- The Hon. George Townshend (1724–1807)
- Viscount Royston (1720–1790)

=== 1761 ===
- The Earl of Albemarle (1724–1772)
- The Earl of Shaftesbury (1711–1771)
- Sir Francis Dashwood, Bt (1708–1781)
- The Earl Talbot (1710–1782)
- James Grenville (1715–1783)
- The Marquess of Granby (1721–1770)
- The Earl of Powis (1703–1772)
- The Earl of Egremont (1710–1763)
- The Hon. James Stuart-Mackenzie (1718–1800)
- Robert Hay Drummond (1711–1776)
- Thomas Hayter (1702–1762)

=== 1762 ===
- The Duke of Argyll (c.1693–1770)
- Lord George Cavendish (1727–1794)
- Sir Charles Pratt (1714–1794)
- Richard Osbaldeston (1691–1764)
- The Earl of Lichfield (1718–1772)
- Sir John Cust, Bt (1718–1770)
- Gilbert Elliot (1722–1777)
- The Lord Tyrawley (1682–1773)
- The Duke of Marlborough (1739–1817)
- The Earl of Marchmont (1708–1794)
- The Earl of Northumberland (c. 1714–1786)
- Hans Stanley (1721–1780)
- Lord Strange (1716–1771)

=== 1763 ===
- Humphry Morice (1723–1785)
- Sir John Philipps, Bt (c. 1701–1764)
- The Earl of Shelburne (1737–1805)
- Lord Charles Spencer (1740–1820)
- James Oswald (1715–1769)
- Richard Rigby (1722–1788)
- The Earl of Ilchester (1704–1776)
- The Earl of Hertford (1718–1794)
- The Viscount Stormont (1727–1796)
- The Lord Hyde (1709–1786)

=== 1764 ===
- Richard Terrick (1710–1777)
- Sir Thomas Sewell (c.1710–1784)
- The Duke of Gloucester (1743–1805)

=== 1765 ===
- The Viscount Weymouth (1734–1796)
- Lord Frederick Campbell (1729–1816)
- The Duke of Portland (1738–1809)
- The Duke of Grafton (1735–1811)
- The Marquess of Rockingham (1730–1782)
- The Hon. Henry Seymour Conway (1721–1795)
- William Dowdeswell (1721–1775)
- The Earl of Scarbrough (1725–1782)
- The Earl of Ashburnham (1724–1812)
- The Earl of Bessborough (1704–1793)
- Viscount Villiers (1735–1805)
- The Earl of Dartmouth (1731–1801)
- The Viscount Howe (1726–1799)
- The Lord Edgcumbe (1720–1795)
- Thomas Pelham (1728–1805)
- The Duke of Richmond (1735–1806)
- The Earl Verney (1714–1791)

=== 1766 ===
- The Duke of Dorset (1711–1769)
- The Earl of Breadalbane (1696–1782)
- Sir John Eardley Wilmot (1709–1792)
- Sir Charles Saunders (c.1715–1775)
- Isaac Barré (1726–1802)
- The Earl of Bristol (1721–1775)
- Prince Henry, Duke of Cumberland and Strathearn (1745–1790)
- Sir John Shelley, Bt (1730–1783)
- Lord North (1732–1792)
- Sir Edward Hawke (1705–1781)
- The Duke of Bolton (1720–1794)

=== 1767 ===
- Thomas Townshend (1733–1800)
- George Onslow (1731–1814)

=== 1768 ===
- The Hon. Thomas Harley (1730–1804)
- The Lord Cathcart (1721–1776)
- The Hon. Sir Joseph Yorke (1724–1792)
- The Hon. Frederick Cornwallis (1713–1783)
- The Duke of Newcastle (1720–1794)

=== 1769 ===
- Sir Fletcher Norton (1716–1789)
- Sir James Gray, Bt (c. 1708–1773)

=== 1770 ===
- The Hon. Charles Yorke (1722–1770)
- The Duke of Somerset (1717–1792)
- The Lord Grantham (1738–1786)
- George Rice (1724–1779)
- The Earl Cornwallis (1738–1805)
- The Hon. Henry Thynne (1735–1826)

=== 1771 ===
- The Earl of Suffolk and Berkshire (1739–1779)
- The Lord Apsley (1714–1794)
- Viscount Hinchingbrook (1744–1814)
- Sir William de Grey (1719–1781)
- The Earl of Pomfret (1722–1785)
- Sir Lawrence Dundas, Bt (1710–1781)

=== 1772 ===
- Sir Jeffrey Amherst (1717–1797)
- Sir Thomas Parker (1695–1784)

=== 1773 ===
- Charles Jenkinson (1727–1808)
- Sir William Lynch (c. 1730–1785)
- Sir John Goodricke, Bt (1708–1789)

=== 1774 ===
- Sir William Meredith, Bt (c. 1725–1790)
- Jeremiah Dyson (1722–1776)

=== 1775 ===
- The Duke of Chandos (1731–1789)
- The Lord Lyttelton (1744–1779)

=== 1776 ===
- The Lord Bruce of Tottenham (1729–1814)
- The Duke of Montagu (1712–1790)
- Henry Flood (1732–1791) (struck off 1781)

=== 1777 ===
- William Markham (1719–1807)
- The Earl of Carlisle (1748–1825)
- Robert Lowth (1710–1787)
- Charles Townshend (1728–1810)
- Sir Sidney Smythe (1705–1778)
- The Marquess of Carmarthen (1751–1799)

=== 1778 ===
- The Lord Thurlow (1731–1806)

=== 1779 ===
- The Duke of Ancaster and Kesteven (1756–1779)
- Viscount Mountstuart (1744–1814)

=== 1780 ===
- Viscount Beauchamp (1743–1822)
- Sir Richard Worsley, Bt (1751–1805)
- Alexander Wedderburn (1733–1805)
- The Earl of Salisbury (1748–1823)
- Charles Wolfran Cornwall (1735–1789)

=== 1782 ===
- The Earl of Shannon (1727–1807)
- The Duke of Dorset (1745–1799)
- Lord John Cavendish (1732–1796)
- John Dunning (1731–1783)
- The Hon. Charles James Fox (1749–1806) (expelled 1798; readmitted 1806)
- Augustus Keppel (1725–1786)
- Edmund Burke (1729–1797)
- The Duke of Manchester (1737–1788)
- The Earl of Effingham (1746–1791)
- The Earl Ludlow (1730–1803)
- Sir George Yonge, Bt (1731–1812)
- Lord Ferrers of Chartley (1753-1811)
- Viscount Chewton (1751–1789)
- Lord Robert Spencer (1747–1831)
- The Hon. Sir William Howe (1729–1814)
- The Hon. William Pitt (1759–1806)
- The Earl Temple (1753–1813)
- Henry Dundas (1742–1811) (expelled 1805; readmitted 1807)
- The Earl of Tankerville (1743–1822)

=== 1783 ===
- The Duke of Rutland (1754–1787)
- William Eden (1745–1814)
- The Hon. Charles Francis Greville (1749–1809)
- The Earl Cholmondeley (1749–1827)
- The Hon. Richard Fitzpatrick (1748–1813)
- Frederick Montagu (1733–1800)
- John Moore (1730–1805)
- The Earl of Northington (1747–1786)
- The Earl of Derby (1752–1834)
- George Augustus Frederick, Prince of Wales (1762–1830)
- James Grenville (1742–1825)
- The Earl of Aylesford (1751–1812)
- The Lord Walsingham (1748–1818)
- William Grenville (1759–1834)

=== 1784 ===
- The Earl of Chesterfield (1755–1815)
- Lord George Lenox (1737–1805)
- Lloyd Kenyon (1732–1802)
- The Viscount Galway (1752–1810)
- The Lord Mulgrave (1744–1792)
- The Earl of Courtown (1731–1810)
- Sir James Harris (1746–1820)
- Lord Herbert (1759–1827)

=== 1785 ===
- Thomas Orde (1746–1807)

=== 1786 ===
- John Foster (1740–1828)
- John Beresford (1738–1805)
- Sir John Parnell, Bt (1744–1801)

=== 1787 ===
- John Hely-Hutchinson (1724–1794)
- The Hon. John Villiers (1757–1838)
- Sir John Skynner (1724–1805)
- The Duke of York (1763–1827)
- Alleyne FitzHerbert (1753–1839)
- Beilby Porteous (1731–1809)

=== 1788 ===
- Sir Richard Arden (1744–1804)

=== 1789 ===
- The Earl of Chatham (1756–1835)
- Sir Robert Murray Keith (1730–1795)
- Sir William Wynne (1729–1815)
- The Duke of Clarence (1765–1837)
- Henry Addington (1757–1844)
- The Marquess of Graham (1755–1836)
- The Earl of Westmorland (1759–1841)

=== 1790 ===
- The Viscount Falmouth (1758–1808)
- The Hon. Dudley Ryder (1762–1847)
- The Earl Gower (1758–1833)
- The Lord FitzGibbon (1748–1802)

=== 1791 ===
- Thomas Steele (1753–1823)
- Viscount Parker (1755–1842)
- Sir William Hamilton (1730–1803)

=== 1792 ===
- The Lord Macartney (1737–1806)
- Sir James Eyre (1734–1799)

=== 1793 ===
- Sir Archibald Macdonald (1747–1826)
- Robert Hobart (1760–1816)
- The Earl of Mornington (1760–1842)
- Lord Apsley (1762–1834)
- Viscount Bayham (1759–1840)
- Viscount Belgrave (1767–1845)
- Viscount Stopford (1765–1835)
- Sir Gilbert Elliot, Bt (1751–1814)

=== 1794 ===
- Sylvester Douglas (1743–1823)
- The Earl FitzWilliam (1748–1833)
- The Earl Spencer (1758–1834)
- William Windham (1750–1810)
- Sir Morton Eden (1752–1830)
- Viscount Milton (1746–1808)

=== 1795 ===
- The Hon. Thomas Pelham (1756–1826)
- Sir George Howard (1718–1796)

=== 1796 ===
- The Earl of Kinnoull (1751–1804)
- Sir Grey Cooper, Bt (1726–1801)
- The Duke of Roxburghe (1740–1804)

=== 1797 ===
- Sir Joseph Banks, Bt. (1743–1820)
- Lord Charles Somerset (1767–1831)
- The Hon. Andrew Cochrane (1767–1833)
- The Duke of Atholl (1755–1830)
- The Hon. John Trevor (1748–1824)
- Sir Charles Grey (1729–1807)

=== 1798 ===
- The Lord Cathcart (1755–1843)
- The Earl of Harrington (1753–1829)
- Sir William Scott (1745–1836)
- Thomas Grenville (1755–1846)
- Viscount Castlereagh (1769–1822)

=== 1799 ===
- Sir William Fawcett (1727–1804)
- Lord Hawkesbury (1770–1828)
- The Duke of Kent (1767–1820)
- Prince Ernest Augustus, The Duke of Cumberland (1771–1851)
- The Earl of Elgin (1766–1841)
- Sir John Scott (1751–1838)
- Isaac Corry (1753–1813)
- The Lord Lavington (1739–1807)

=== 1800 ===
- George Canning (1770–1827)
- William Dundas (1762–1845)
- The Lord Whitworth (1752–1825)

=== 1801 ===
- William Stuart (1755–1822)
- Sir John Mitford (1748–1830)
- The Earl of St Vincent (1735–1823)
- Charles Philip Yorke (1764–1834)
- The Lord Arden (1756–1840)
- The Earl of Hardwicke (1757–1834)
- Viscount Lewisham (1755–1810)
- Sir William Grant (1752–1832)
- Charles Abbot (1757–1829)
- Thomas Wallace (1768–1844)
- Charles Bragge (1754–1831)

=== 1802 ===
- William Wickham (1761–1840)
- George Rose (1744–1818)
- Charles Long (1760–1838)
- Prince Adolphus, Duke of Cambridge (1774–1850)
- The Lord Ellenborough (1750–1818)
- Sir John Warren, Bt (1753–1822)
- Sir Charles Morgan, Bt (1726–1806)
- John Smyth (1748–1811)

=== 1803 ===
- John Hiley Addington (1759–1818)
- George Tierney (1761–1830)
- The Hon. Thomas Maitland (1760–1824)
- Nathaniel Bond (1754–1823)

=== 1804 ===
- The Hon. Arthur Paget (1771–1840)
- Sir Evan Nepean, Bt (1751–1822)
- Sir James Mansfield (1733–1821)
- The Earl of Winchilsea and Nottingham (1752–1826)
- Lord George Thynne (1770–1838)
- The Lord Mulgrave (1755–1831)
- William Drummond (1770–1828)
- Charles Arbuthnot (1767–1850)
- Lord John Thynne (1772–1849)
- Lord Granville Leveson-Gower (1773–1846)
- Prince Augustus, Duke of Sussex (1773–1843)

=== 1805 ===
- John Hookham Frere (1769–1846)
- John Sullivan (1749–1839)
- Nicholas Vansittart (1766–1851)
- Reginald Pole Carew (1753–1835)
- Charles Manners-Sutton (1755–1828)
- The Lord Barham (1726–1813)
- The Earl of Powis (1754–1839)

=== 1806 ===
- Prince William Frederick, Duke of Gloucester and Edinburgh (1776–1834)
- The Earl of Moira (1754–1826)
- The Earl Temple (1776–1839)
- Lord Henry Petty (1780–1863)
- The Hon. Charles Grey (1764–1845)
- The Hon. Charles James Fox (1749–1806)
- Viscount Morpeth (1773–1848)
- Lord John Townshend (1757–1833)
- The Lord Erskine (1750–1823)
- Richard Brinsley Sheridan (1751–1816)
- The Duke of Bedford (1766–1839)
- The Earl of Carnarvon (1741–1811)
- The Earl of Carysfort (1751–1828)
- Lord Ossulston (1776–1859)
- The Lord St John of Bletso (1759–1817)
- William Elliot (1766–1818)
- George Ponsonby (1755–1817)
- Sir John Newport, Bt (1756–1843)
- The Earl of Donoughmore (1756–1825)
- The Marquess of Douglas and Clydesdale (1767–1852)
- The Earl of Lauderdale (1759–1839)
- The Lord Holland (1773–1840)
- Sir John Anstruther, Bt (1753–1811)

=== 1807 ===
- The Hon. Spencer Perceval (1762–1812)
- The Hon. Robert Dundas (1771–1851)
- Sir James Pulteney, Bt (1755–1811)
- The Duke of Richmond (1764–1819)
- The Lord Teignmouth (1751–1834)
- The Hon. Sir Arthur Wellesley (1769–1852)
- The Lord Manners (1756–1842)
- The Earl of Clancarty (1767–1837)
- The Hon. Henry Pierrepont (1780–1851)
- The Hon. Richard Ryder (1766–1832)

=== 1808 ===
- The Hon. Edward Venables (1757–1847)
- The Earl of Mount Edgcumbe (1764–1839)
- The Viscount Strangford (1780–1855)

=== 1809 ===
- Sir John Nicholl (1759–1838)
- Sir David Dundas (1735-1820)
- John Randolph (1749–1813)
- The Hon. William Wellesley-Pole (1763–1845)
- The Viscount Palmerston (1784–1865)
- Charles Manners-Sutton (1780–1845)
- The Lord Sheffield (1735–1821)
- The Hon. Henry Wellesley (1773–1847)

=== 1810 ===
- Sir John Sinclair, Bt (1754–1835)

=== 1812 ===
- The Marquess of Winchester (1764–1843)
- The Earl of Yarmouth (1777–1842)
- John McMahon (c.1754–1817)
- Viscount Jocelyn (1788–1870)
- Robert Liston (1742–1836)
- Lord Charles Bentinck (1780–1826)
- Lord George Beresford (1781–1839)
- William FitzGerald (1783–1843)
- Robert Peel (1788–1850)
- The Hon. F. J. Robinson (1782–1859)

=== 1813 ===
- Sir Thomas Plumer (1753–1824)
- William Howley (1766–1848)
- Sir Vicary Gibbs (1751–1820)

=== 1814 ===
- Hugh Elliot (1752–1830)
- Sir Alexander Thomson (1744–1817)
- Warren Hastings (1732–1818)
- The Earl of Shaftesbury (1768–1851)
- The Earl of Aberdeen (1784–1860)
- The Lord Stewart (1778–1854)
- Lord Binning (1780–1858)
- William Huskisson (1770–1830)
- William Sturges Bourne (1769–1845)

=== 1815 ===
- William Adam (1751–1839)
- The Lord Amherst (1773–1857)

=== 1816 ===
- Edward Thornton (1766–1852)
- Sir Henry Russell, Bt (1751–1836)

=== 1817 ===
- Sir Richard Richards (1752–1823)
- Sir George Hill, Bt (1763–1839)
- John Beckett (1775–1847)
- Sir Benjamin Bloomfield (1768–1846)
- The Earl Talbot (1777–1849)
- John Leach (1760–1834)
- Sir William à Court, Bt (1779–1860)

=== 1818 ===
- George Henry Rose (1770–1855)
- Sir Charles Abbott (1762–1832)
- Sir Robert Dallas (1756–1824)

=== 1819 ===
- Charles Grant (1778–1866)
- Sir Samuel Shepherd (1760–1840)
