= Exchequer of Ireland =

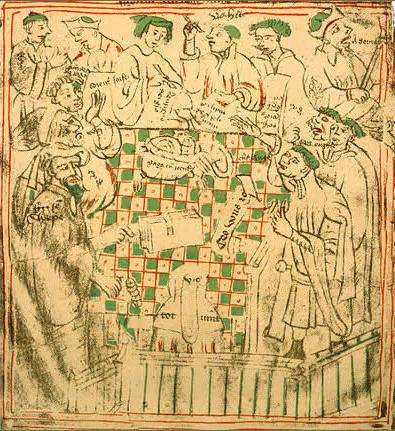
The Exchequer of Ireland at work during the 15th century.

The Exchequer of Ireland was a body in the Kingdom of Ireland tasked with collecting royal revenue. Modelled on the English Exchequer, it was created in 1210 after King John of England applied English law and legal structure to his Lordship of Ireland. The Exchequer was divided into two parts; the Superior Exchequer, which acted as a court of equity and revenue in a way similar to the English Exchequer of Pleas, and the Inferior Exchequer, which directly collected revenue from those who owed The Crown money, principally rents for Crown lands. The Exchequer primarily worked in a way similar to the English legal system, holding a similar jurisdiction (down to the use of the Writ of Quominus to take over cases from the Irish Court of Chancery). Following the Act of Union 1800, which incorporated Ireland into the United Kingdom, the Exchequer was merged with the English Exchequer in 1817 and ceased to function as an independent body, although the Irish Court of Exchequer, like other Irish courts, remained separate from the English equivalent.

== History ==
The Exchequer of Ireland was formed in 1210, when King John applied English law, which included the Exchequer, to Ireland. Like the English Exchequer, the Exchequer of Ireland was divided into two parts; the judicial, or Superior Exchequer, which was a court, and the receipt, or Inferior Exchequer, which was tasked with receiving rents and other revenues for The Crown. The principal purpose of the Exchequer was to act as a treasury, taking in revenues, with the receipt department collecting money and the court acting in cases where this money was not paid, or where there was some dispute over it. As with the English Exchequer, the judicial part was a court of both law and equity, and was occasionally known as the Irish Exchequer of Pleas, after the English body. The Inferior Exchequer, tasked with collecting revenues, remained part of the Exchequer long after the English Inferior Exchequer had become a distinct body called the Treasury. The Exchequer was finally dissolved in 1817, when it was amalgamated with the Exchequer of Great Britain following the Act of Union 1800.

The "Red Book of the Irish Exchequer" (so-called by analogy with the English Red Book of the Exchequer) was a 14th-century compilation of Exchequer practice, including the text of the Magna Carta Hiberniae, destroyed in the 1922 Four Courts explosion.

For much of its history it was based in Dublin, but in the fourteenth century, it moved in 1361, with some of the royal courts, to Carlow, as being more central for the Anglo-Irish government. However, Carlow was raided and burnt by the Irish clans of Leinster at least three times. As a result, the Exchequer moved back to Dublin for a time in the 1360s and eventually the entire administration returned there in 1393.

== Procedure ==
Court hearings were held before the Barons of the Exchequer of Ireland, along with the Chancellor and Treasurer; in practice, only the Barons attended. The Court's jurisdiction was over matters pertaining to The Crown's revenues, although the Writ of Quominus was used as a work of legal fiction to widen its remit. The procedure used was similar to that in the Court of Chancery, and as such the officials of the court could only be sued through the Exchequer, not through any other body, particularly if the case was about their professional actions. As a result of the Writ of Quominus, anyone identified as a debtor to The Crown could bring a case. Every Irish case which involved the King and his revenue was brought to the Irish Exchequer of Pleas; if brought to another court, it would be relocated to the Exchequer. All cases were recorded, first in the Plea rolls and then in the Pipe Rolls, which recorded the revenues and debts owed to The Crown.

== Officials ==
=== Superior Exchequer ===
The Superior Exchequer, occasionally known as the Irish Exchequer of Pleas, had a variety of officers. At its head was the Lord High Treasurer, the third-highest Officer of the Crown in Ireland. The Lord High Treasurer was able to hear any case in the Exchequer of Pleas, and was also tasked with maintaining and increasing The Crown's revenue in Ireland. The Collection of Revenue Act 1795 transferred his powers to the Lord High Treasurer of the United Kingdom; with the unification of Ireland and Great Britain, an additional Treasurer was no longer needed. The next most important figure was the Chancellor of the Exchequer of Ireland, who acted as a check on the Treasurer and sat during court hearings. In court, he was assisted by the three Barons of the Exchequer of Ireland; the Lord Chief, second and third Barons. The Lord Chief Baron was the most senior judge, sitting in all cases and hearing all nisi prius actions alone. Outside of the judiciary, the Auditor-General was tasked with entering all grants of land and records of rent, as a result being an officer of both the Superior and Inferior departments of the Exchequer. In this, he was assisted by the Surveyor-General, who kept records of all Crown lands, and the Remembrancers, who took the oaths of people pursuing a case.

The Supreme Court of Judicature Act (Ireland) 1877 merged the Four Superior Courts into one High Court of Justice in Ireland, with the Court of Exchequer becoming its Exchequer Division. This division was abolished in 1897, although the last Chief Baron of the Irish Exchequer retained his title until retiring from the High Court of Justice in 1916.

=== Inferior Exchequer ===
The officers of the Inferior Exchequer included the Lord High Treasurer, who in practice rarely acted, and his deputy the Vice-Treasurer, who as a result did most of the work. The Treasurers were in charge of all of The Crown's revenue in Ireland, signing and approving all orders accepting money and paying it out. They were assisted by the Teller or Cashier, who actively collected the money, and the Clerk of the Pells, who logged the Teller's receipts. The Treasurers were accountable for their revenues to a Commission, established by Great Britain, which consisted of the Chancellor of the Exchequer of Ireland, the Lord High Chancellor, the Lord Chief Baron and the other two Barons of the Irish Exchequer. These Commissioners were expected to make an annual review, and also inspected other bodies, such as the Board of Works and the Board of Ordnance.

== Bibliography ==
- H., M. T. (1932). "Review: History of the Financial Administration of Ireland to 1817 by T. J. Kiernan". Irish Province of the Society of Jesus. 21 (81).
- Howard, Gorges Edmond (1776). A treatise of the Exchequer and revenue of Ireland. Vol. 1. J.A. Husband. OCLC 5111516.
- Thomas, Francis Sheppard (1848). The Ancient Exchequer of England; the Treasury; and Origin of the Present Management of the Exchequer and Treasury of Ireland. J. Petheram. OCLC 465938569.

== External source ==
Irish Medieval Exchequer records 1250 and 1450 are available as a free searchable resource at https://www.virtualtreasury.ie/gold-seams/medieval-exchequer
