= Alan Chambré =

English judge

The Right Honourable Sir Alan Chambré
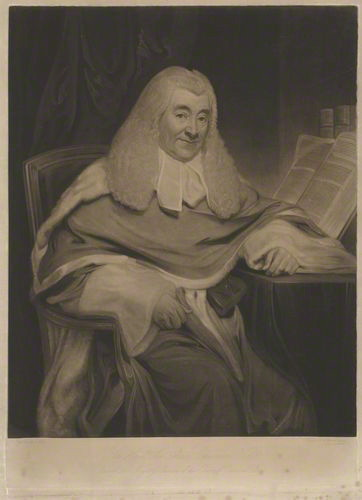
- Sir Alan Chambré, mezzotint by Henry Meyer, after Sir William Allan

court of common pleas

Personal details
- Born: 4 October 1739 Kendal, Westmorland
- Died: 20 September 1823 (aged 83) Harrogate

Sir Alan Chambré (4 October 1739 – 20 September 1823) was an English judge.

== Life ==
He was the eldest son of Walter Chambré, of Halhead Hall, Kendal, in Westmorland. He was a barrister through his wife, Mary, who was the daughter of Jacob Morland of Capplethwaite Hall in the same county. He was born at Kendal on 4 October 1739. After receiving an early education at Kendal Grammar School, he was sent to Sedbergh School under the care of Wynne Bateman.

From Sedbergh he went to London, where he entered the office of Forth Wintour, as solicitor, in Pall Mall. He also became a member of the Society of Staple Inn. He moved to Middle Temple in February 1758 and in November 1764 from the Middle Temple to Gray's Inn. In May 1767 he was called to the bar, and went to the northern circuit, of which he soon became one of the leaders. He was elected to the bench of Gray's Inn in June 1781, and in 1783 filled the annual office of treasurer.

In 1796, he was appointed recorder of Lancaster. Upon the retirement of Richard Perryn from the judicial bench, he was chosen as his successor. In order to qualify for the bench, it was necessary that Chambré be made a serjeant-at-law.

As Perryn had retired just before the summer circuit, and serjeants could only be called in term, a special act of Parliament, the Courts of Exchequer Act 1799 (39 Geo. 3. c. 67), was passed authorising, for the first time, the appointment of a serjeant in the vacation. Under the provisions of this act, Chambré received the degree of serjeant on 2 July 1799, and was appointed a baron of the exchequer on the same day.

Lord Chief Justice James Eyre died five days after the special act had received royal assent. The same difficulty occurred again, and a general act, the Appointment of Judges in Vacation Act 1799 (39 Geo. 3. c. 113), was passed in the same session authorising the appointment of any barrister to the degree of serjeant during the vacation if done for the purpose of filling up a vacancy on the bench. Lord Eldon was the first judge appointed under the provisions of this act.

On 13 June 1800, Chambré was transferred to the court of common pleas, as successor to Sir Francis Buller. In this court he remained until December 1815, when he resigned his seat. Sitting on the bench for more than fifteen years, he became entitled to a pension of £2,000 a year by virtue of the Judges' Pensions Act 1799 (39 Geo. 3. c. 110), which had been passed in the same year in which he had been appointed a judge.

Chambré died at Crown Inn, Harrogate, on 20 September 1823, at age 84, and was buried in the family vault in Kendal parish church, where a monument was erected to his memory. He was never married, and was succeeded in his estates by his nephew, Thomas Chambré.
