= Exchequer of Pleas =

English-Welsh court for common and equity law (1190s–1880)

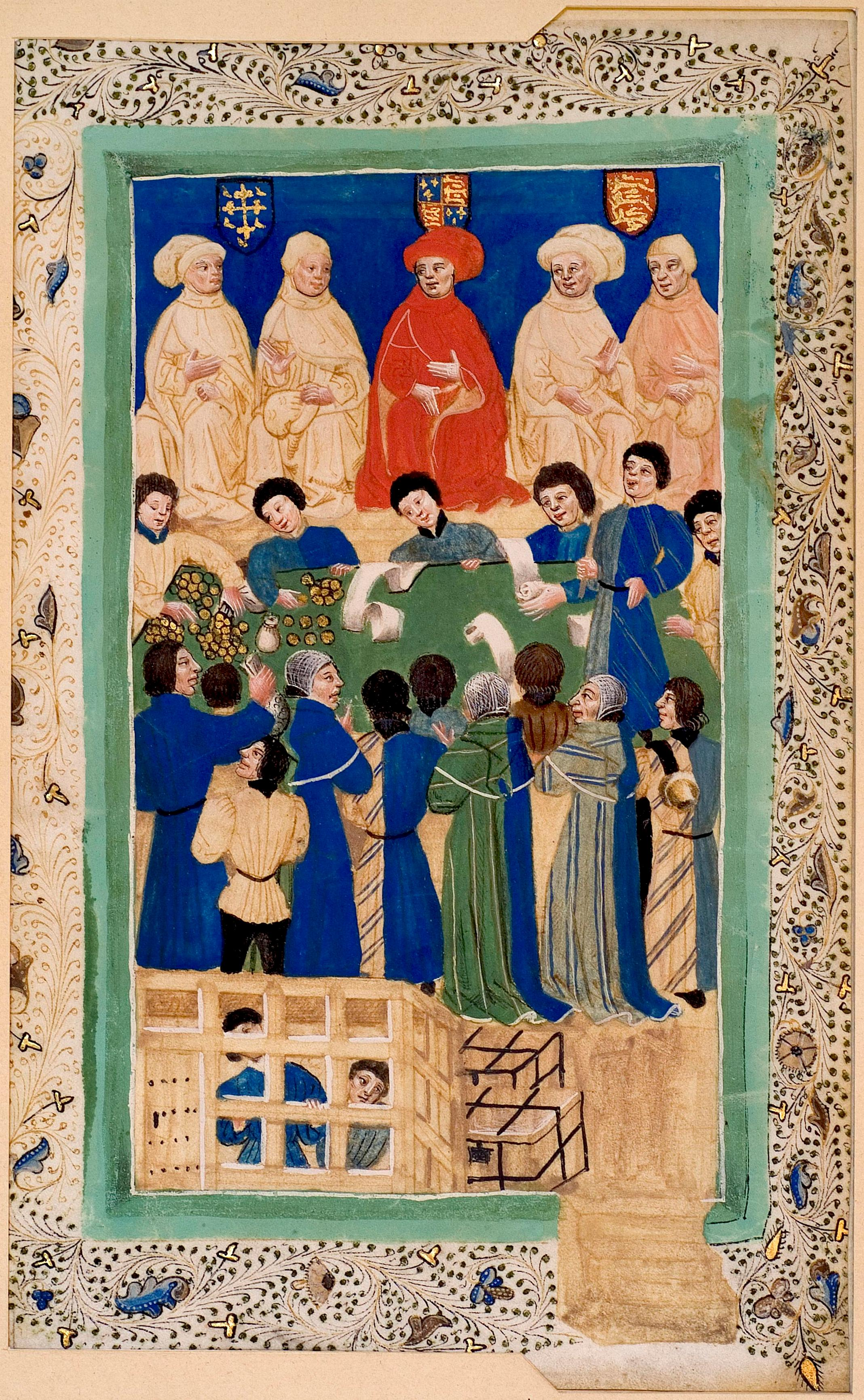
The Court of Exchequer c. 1460.

The term Exchequer of Pleas describes an aspect of the Court of Exchequer: a 'collateral and derivative department of its jurisdiction', namely its function as a Court of Common Law for the adjudication of Civil Pleas. For much of its history the Exchequer had a threefold jurisdiction: as a Court of Revenue, a Court of Civil Pleas and a Court of Equity. The 'Plea side' of the Court was administered by the Office of the Clerk of the Pleas in the Exchequer.

The Exchequer was, in origin, a Court of Crown Revenue, which had split from the curia regis in the 1190s. The extension of its jurisdiction from collecting and protecting the revenues of the Crown to cover the adjudication of civil pleas (i.e. lawsuits between individuals) was described in the 19th century as 'obviously and confessedly grounded on usurpation, now confirmed by immemorial usage, founded on a tacit but universal acknowledgment of its utility and convenience'.

From its foundation, the Exchequer had by royal prerogative exercised a limited jurisdiction in civil pleas (particularly in cases where the resolution of a civil suit might serve to expedite the main business of the court), but it lost much of its common law jurisdiction after the formation of the Court of Common Pleas. Subsequently, however, a legal fiction was employed (the writ of quominus), which allowed the Exchequer to look at "common" cases between subject and subject; this discretionary area was soon significantly expanded, and the Exchequer soon regained its standing in common law matters.

By the end of the 15th century, the Exchequer was exercising a threefold jurisdiction: as well as functioning as a Court of Revenue and as a Court of Common Pleas, it had begun to function also as a Court of Equity. The 'Equity side' of the Exchequer was separate from the 'Plea side'; it sat within the Office of the King's Remembrancer, rather than the Office of the Clerk of the Pleas. Equity, a set of legal principles based on natural law and common law, was properly the remit of the Court of Chancery; however the latter's reputation for tardiness and expense resulted in much of its business transferring to the Exchequer. Cases in equity were nominally taken by the Chancellor of the Exchequer, but in practice were heard by the Barons of the Exchequer (and latterly by the Chief Baron of the Exchequer sitting alone in the Exchequer Chamber).

The Court of Exchequer in Equity and the Court of Chancery, having similar jurisdictions, drew closer together over the years until an argument was made during the 19th century that having two seemingly identical courts was unnecessary. As a result, the Exchequer lost its equity jurisdiction in 1841, though it retained its remaining jurisdiction (on the 'Revenue side' and the 'Plea side') and continued as such to function as a judicial body. Following the passing of the Judicature Acts of 1873 and 1875, the Court of Exchequer was consolidated together with other ancient Courts in England to form the Supreme Court of Judicature: initially, the officers and business of the old court were transferred to an Exchequer Division of the new High Court but, by an Order in Council on 16 December 1880, both the Exchequer Division was merged, along with the Common Pleas Division, into the Queen's Bench Division and the old Exchequer office of Lord Chief Baron was abolished.

== History ==
=== Origins ===
It was originally claimed that the Exchequer was based on a similar Norman court. While there are many records of the Exchequer's work in England, there is no evidence of a similar body in pre-conquest Normandy. The first reliable records come from the time of Henry I, when the sole surviving Pipe roll from his reign shows the Exchequer working out of the king's palace as part of the curia regis. The curia regis followed the king as he travelled, rather than sitting at any one fixed location, and was held in York, London and Northampton at various times.

By the late 12th century it had taken to sitting in a fixed location, the one body of government in England to do so. By the 1170s it was possible to distinguish the Exchequer's work from that of the other parts of the curia regis, although the king of the time considered the Exchequer to simply be an element of the curia. It was referred to as the Curia Regis ad Scaccarium, or King's Court at Exchequer. The word "Exchequer" derives from the chequered cloth laid on a table for the purposes of counting money.

In the 1190s the Exchequer began separating from the curia regis, a process which continued until the beginning of the 13th century. Academics have suggested that this was due to an increasing demand on the revenue side of the court, which led to part of the common law element being split off to form the Court of Common Pleas. Although the Exchequer of Pleas was the first common law court, it was the last to separate from the curia regis.

=== Increasing work and transformation ===
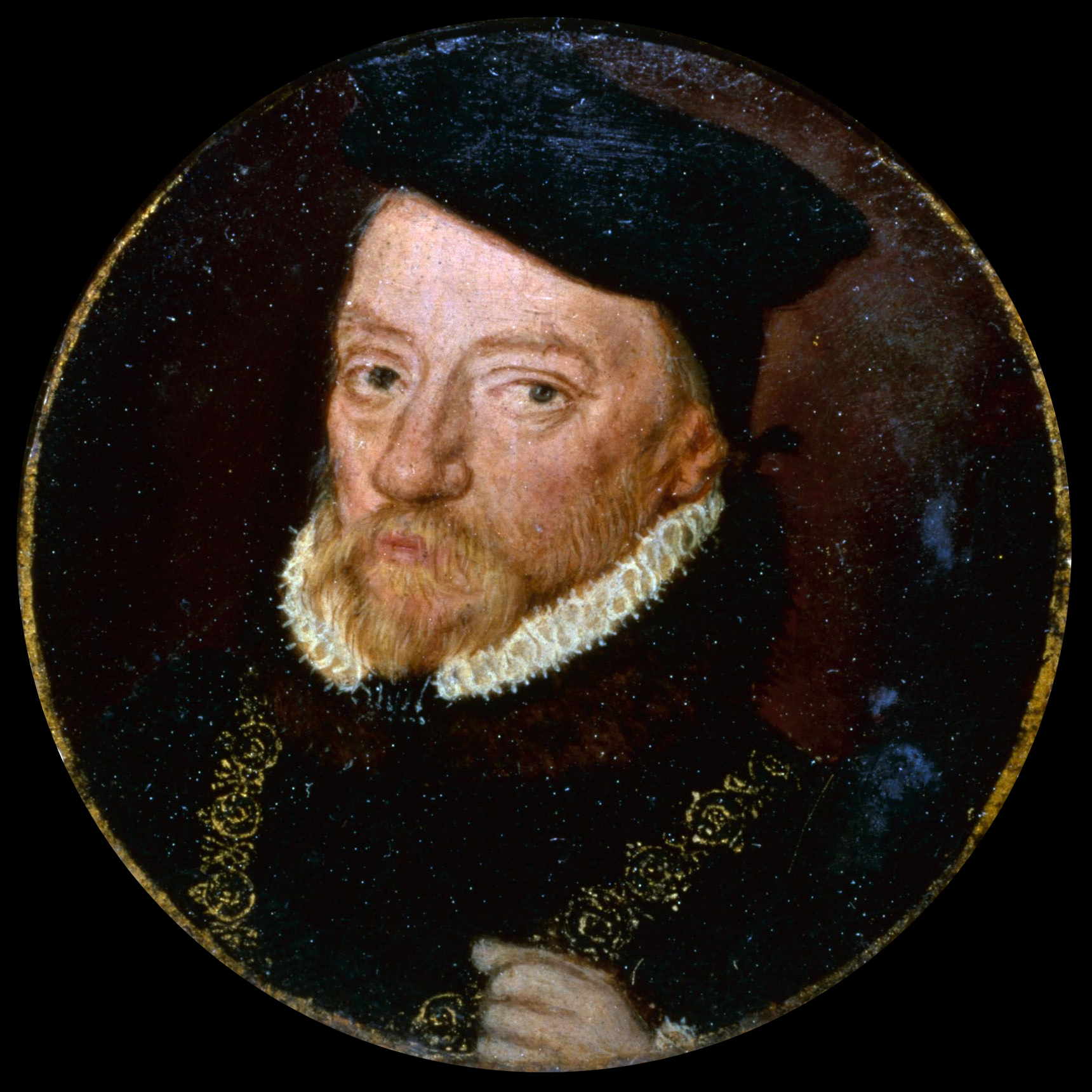
William Paulet, who as Lord High Treasurer significantly increased the power and influence of the Exchequer

There are few records known to date from before 1580, as bills were not dated before then. Until the 16th century, the Exchequer carried out its duties with little variation in its function or practice. A small court, the Exchequer handled around 250 cases a year, compared to 2,500 in the Court of King's Bench and 10,000 in the Court of Common Pleas. Under the Tudors, the Exchequer's political, judicial and fiscal importance all increased. This was partially thanks to the Lord High Treasurer. Although the Lord Chancellor was more traditionally important, the Lord High Treasurers from 1547 to 1612 were politically influential figures, including Robert Cecil, Thomas Sackville and William Paulet. Since the Lord High Treasurer was head of the Exchequer, with the Treasurer's increased influence came increased importance for the Exchequer.

The appointment of the second and third Dukes of Norfolk as Lord High Treasurers from 1501 to 1546 led to a gradual reduction in the Exchequer's power. The Dukes were seen by the government as too independent to be trusted with any real power, but too useful to be removed. As a result, to indirectly reduce their power, the Exchequer was deliberately weakened. When William Paulet was appointed Treasurer in 1546 the Exchequer again increased in power, absorbing the Court of Augmentations and Court of First Fruits and Tenths by 1554. The Exchequer was assisted in this period by Thomas Fanshawe, the Queen's Remembrancer. A capable man, Fanshawe was often consulted by the Barons of the Exchequer as to the best way to administer the court, and helped standardise pleadings, allowing the Exchequer to cope during a period of increased business. Fanshawe's administrative reforms were considered excellent, and his work continued to be used as the standard until the 1830s.

Exchequer business increased under James and Charles I, before the English Civil War disrupted the courts. With the increasing use of the Writ of Quominus, which allowed royal debtors to bring a case against a third party who owed them money if it was that lack of money which prevented them paying the king and the new regime, the Exchequer actively transformed from a "tax court" dealing with civil cases to a dedicated court of equity and common law.

The Civil War caused four equitable courts to be dissolved. The Court of Star Chamber was formally dissolved in 1641, the Council of the North and Council of Wales and the Marches had their equity jurisdiction stripped by the same Act of Parliament, and the Court of Requests became invalid after the Privy Seal was invalidated by the outcome of the English Civil War, as it was dependent on the Seal for its authority. After the War ended there were only two equity courts remaining, the Exchequer and Court of Chancery. The Court of Chancery was publicly reviled for its slow pace and because it was led by the Lord Chancellor John Finch, a political figure who had been intimately involved in the conflict. As a result, the Exchequer increased in importance as a court, although it is not known whether its active transformation was a judicial or political decision.

=== Loss of equity jurisdiction and dissolution ===
English common law courts before the Judicature Acts

By the beginning of the 18th century, the equity jurisdiction of the Exchequer of Pleas was firmly cemented, and it was considered a viable alternative to the Court of Chancery. As a result, each court cited the other's cases as precedent, and drew closely together. In addition, 18th-century Acts of Parliament treated them in the same way, merely referring to "courts of equity" rather than mentioning them individually. At the same time, the Treasury became more and more important, leading to a reduction in the inferior Exchequer's influence. Despite these warning signs, the Exchequer continued to flourish, maintaining a large amount of business, and by 1810 was almost entirely an equity court, having little common law work.

The court's equity side became deeply unpopular during the 1830s because many cases were heard by a single judge with no real prospect of appeal; while cases could be taken to the House of Lords, it was highly expensive and time-consuming to do so. The Court of Chancery, however, had long had an established method of appealing to the Lords, and later introduced an intermediary appellate court – the Court of Appeal in Chancery.

At the same time, many elements of the Exchequer's equity business had dried up, with the Tithe Commutation Act 1836 ending their tithe cases and the Insolvent Debtors Act 1820 establishing the Court of Bankruptcy, removing cases of insolvency from the Exchequer. The Exchequer's fees were also higher than those of the Court of Chancery, and with both courts now using almost identical precedent it was seen as unnecessary to maintain two equitable courts. As a result, the Administration of Justice Act 1841 formally dissolved the equitable jurisdiction of the court.

With the loss of its equitable jurisdiction, the Exchequer became a dedicated common law court, and thus fell prey to the same fate as the other two common law courts (the Court of Queen's Bench and the Court of Common Pleas) during the late 19th century. There had long been calls for the merger of the courts, and in 1828 Henry Brougham, a Member of Parliament, complained in Parliament that as long as there were three courts unevenness was inevitable, saying that "It is not in the power of the courts, even if all were monopolies and other restrictions done away, to distribute business equally, as long as suitors are left free to choose their own tribunal", and that there would always be a favourite court, which would therefore attract the best lawyers and judges and entrench its position.

In 1867 a commission was created to look into issues with the central courts, and the outcome were the Judicature Acts, under which all the central courts were made part of a single Supreme Court of Judicature, with the three central common law courts becoming three of the five divisions of the Supreme Court; this was not designed to be permanent, but rather to avoid having to retire or demote two of the three Chief Justices to allow a single head of the Supreme Court, as this would have violated the constitutional principle that senior justices were irremovable. By sheer chance Fitzroy Kelly and Alexander Cockburn, Lord Chief Baron of the Exchequer and Lord Chief Justice of England, respectively, both died in 1880, allowing the merger of the common law divisions of the Supreme Court into a single division, the Queen's Bench Division, under John Coleridge, who had been Lord Chief Justice of the Common Pleas and became Lord Chief Justice of England, by an Order in Council of 16 December 1880. At this point, the Exchequer of Pleas formally ceased to exist.

== Jurisdiction and relationship with other courts ==
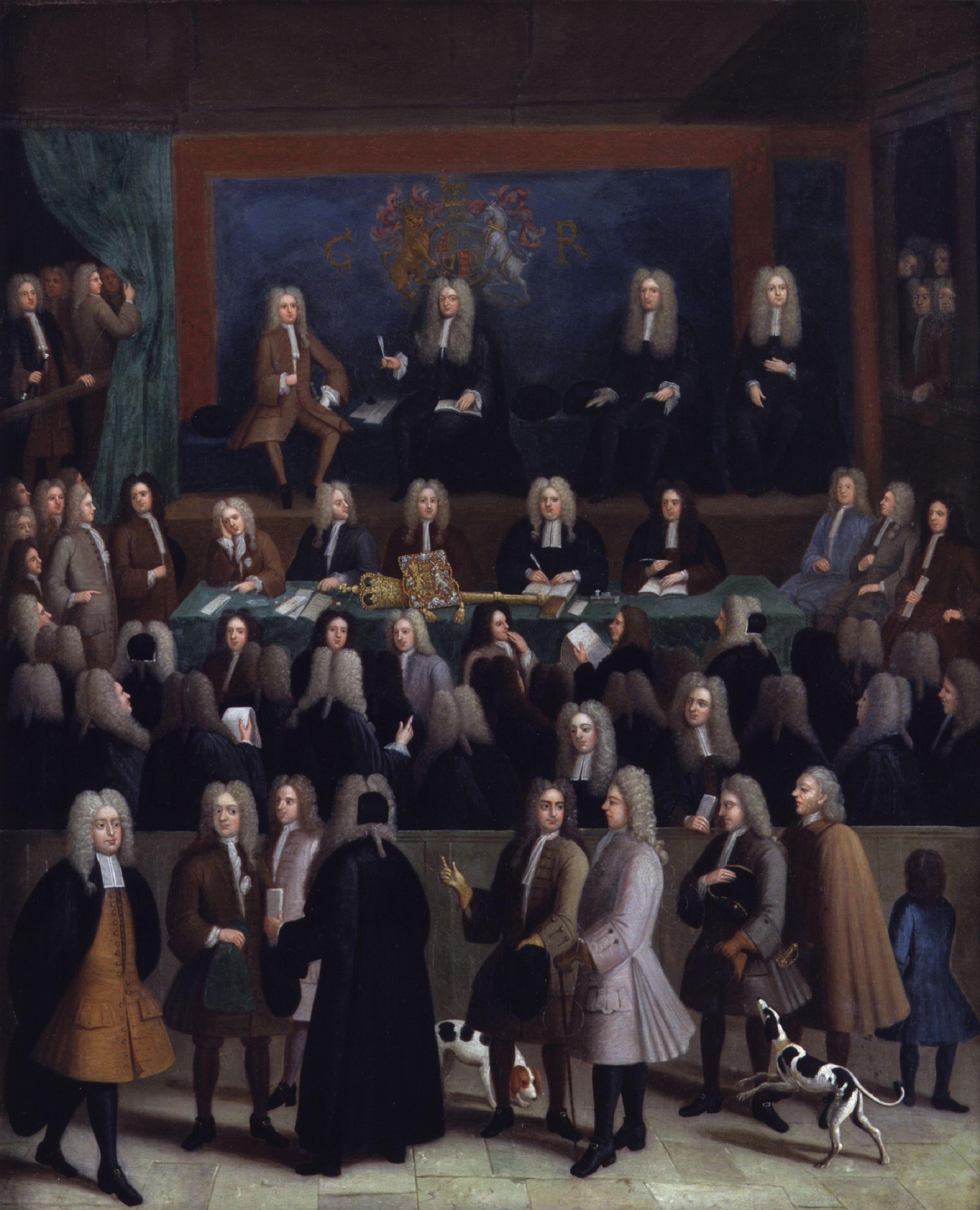
The Court of Chancery, England's only other dedicated court of equity after the English Civil War

The Exchequer's position as a court originally came from an informal process of argument between the king and his debtors as to how much money was owed; by the 13th century, this had evolved into formal court proceedings. Therefore, its initial jurisdiction, as defined by the Statute of Rhuddlan, was as a court where only the king could bring cases. The Exchequer became the first "tax court", where the king was the plaintiff and the debtor the defendant. The king was represented by the Attorney General, allowing him to avoid much of the legal costs associated with a court case.

The "next logical step" was to allow debtors to collect on their own debts in the Exchequer, so that they could better pay the king; this was done through the Writ of Quominus. The Exchequer also had sole jurisdiction to try cases against their own officials and other figures engaged in collecting the royal revenue. The court was also used to prosecute clerics who, while innocent, had come close to committing an infraction; as the plaintiff was represented by the Attorney General, the costs were reduced, and as the Attorney General had no incentive to compromise it was more threatening to the cleric. In 1649 the Exchequer formally extended its common law and equity jurisdiction, becoming a fully fledged court of law able to hear any civil case.

The main focus of the Exchequer was the collection of royal revenue as part of the greater Exchequer, which was officially undertaken by the Lord High Treasurer. The Exchequer was unique in having jurisdiction in matters of both equity and the common law, the latter initially curtailed after the Magna Carta and reserved for the Court of King's Bench and Court of Common Pleas, although it later grew back. This process of common law and equity was reversed; during the 16th century the Exchequer was solely a common law body, with the equity jurisdiction only again becoming relevant near the end of the Tudor period. W. H. Bryson argues that this happened during the reign of Edward I. By 1590 the Exchequer's jurisdiction over equity cases was confirmed, and it was handling a significant number a year, including disputes over trusts, mortgages, tithes and copyholds; since taxation was ever-present, it was not difficult to show that the dispute prevented the payment of a debt to the monarch, allowing the Writ of Quominus.

The Exchequer stood on an equal footing with the other Westminster courts (the Court of Common Pleas, Court of King's Bench and Court of Chancery), with cases transferred easily from one to another, although there were problems in the case of the Court of King's Bench. The traditional method for moving a case was the writ of supersedeas, but the King's Bench represented the monarch, who could not have writs placed against him. Instead, a clerk would bring the Red Book of the Exchequer to the King's Bench and assert that the case's claimant was an officer of the Exchequer, necessitating his trial there rather than in the King's Bench.

The Exchequer maintained a clear rule with the other equity court, the Court of Chancery; a case heard in one could not be re-heard in the other. Apart from that, cases of equity could be heard by either court. The Exchequer had superior status over inferior courts of equity, able to take cases from them and countermand their decisions. The jurisdiction of ecclesiastical courts also overlapped with that of the Exchequer, particularly in relation to the collection of tithes, and there are many records of disputes between the two.

As well as appeals to the Exchequer Chamber, the court also allowed appeals to the House of Lords, which was first used in 1660 for the case of Fanshawe v Impey and confirmed in 1677.

== Officers ==
=== Treasurer ===
The formal head of the Exchequer for much of its existence was the Lord High Treasurer, who was tasked with collecting royal revenues. Originally a clerk, he was supervised by the Chief Justiciar, and only became head of the court after this position was abolished during the reign of Henry III. During the reign of Elizabeth I the Treasurer's other duties began to increase, and he played less of a role in the Exchequer's affairs. By the 17th century, the Lord High Treasurer had been replaced by a dedicated Treasurer of the Exchequer (although earlier writs show that the Lord High Treasurer had been independently given this title), who was ceremoniously presented with a white staff by the monarch. The Treasurer, while active in the revenue side of the Exchequer, played little or no active role in the Exchequer of Pleas.

=== Chancellor ===
The Chancellor of the Exchequer, independently head of the Court of Chancery, was also involved in the Exchequer of Pleas as a check on the Lord High Treasurer. He evolved out of the Lord Chancellor's clerk, or clericus cancellari, who sat in the Exchequer and was responsible for correcting and sealing writs of summons, also holding the Exchequer's copy of the Great Seal. The earliest appearances of such a clerk in the records come from 1220, when a document was signed by Robert de Neville, cancellarius. The Lord Chancellors of the time were clergymen with little interest in judicial or fiscal matters; as a result, the clerk became more independent from the Chancellor and, by the 1230s, became a royal appointment holding the seal independently of the Lord Chancellor, known as the Chancellor of the Exchequer.

After 1567 the Chancellor was additionally confirmed as the Under-Treasurer of the Exchequer, allowing him to carry out the Treasurer's duties when he was unavailable. The Chancellor was appointed by letters patent, and until 1672 it was a life appointment, then changed to an office "to hold only during the pleasures of the crown". Until the English Civil War the Chancellor of the Exchequer was a judicial office with little political standing; after the War, however, it became seen as a "stepping stone" to higher political appointments. After 1672 it again became an administrative and judicial office, until 1714, when the Chancellor's position as head of the Treasury made it an important appointment again.

=== Barons ===
The main judicial officers were the Barons of the Exchequer, or barones scaccari, who were originally the same judges as those of the Court of King's Bench, only becoming independent positions after the Exchequer's separation from the curia regis. In the early years of the Exchequer's existence, the Barons were the chief auditors of the accounts of England, a role passed to dedicated auditors during the reign of Edward II. With the Exchequer's expansion during the Tudor era, the Barons became more important; where previously only the Chief Baron had been appointed from the Serjeants-at-Law, with the other Barons mere barristers, it became practice for all Barons of the Exchequer to be Serjeants. This further increased the Exchequer's standing, since for the first time it put the Exchequer at the same level as the Court of Common Pleas and Court of King's Bench, where all judges were already required to be Serjeants.

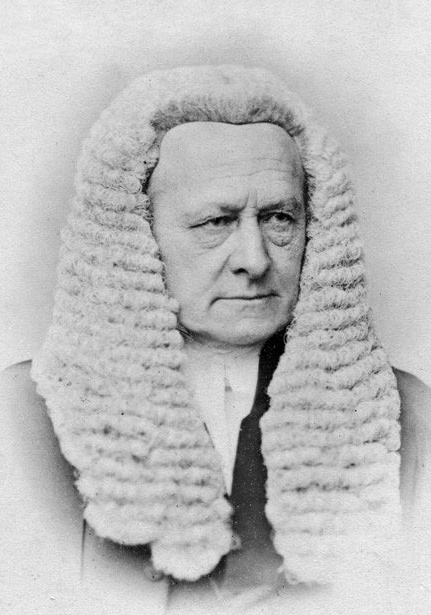
Sir Fitzroy Kelly, the last Chief Baron of the Exchequer

At least one Baron sat to hear a case, with convention insisting on a maximum of four Barons after the rule of Edward IV; as a mere convention, it was occasionally broken. When one Baron was ill or otherwise unable to sit it was felt appropriate to appoint a fifth, as in 1604 when Baron Sotherton was ill, and in 1708, when Baron Smith was called to Edinburgh to be a temporary Chief Baron of the Scottish Exchequer. In 1830 a fifth Baron was permanently added to relieve court congestion; at the same time, a fifth judge was added to the Court of Common Pleas and King's Bench.

The First Baron was the Chief Baron of the Exchequer; if the Chancellor and Treasurer were unavailable, he was the head of the court. When he was also absent the Second Baron took charge, and so on; in one case in 1659, the Fourth Baron was the only judge available. The Second, Third and Fourth Barons were known as puisne Barons; initially treated as individual offices, after the time of James I the order was determined by the judges' seniority. Unlike in the Court of King's Bench, the different positions did not equate to different degrees of power; each Baron had an equal vote in decisions.

Barons were appointed by letters patent and sworn in by the Lord Chancellor, head of the judiciary. During the 16th century they held their offices quamdiu se bene gesserint, or "during good behaviour". A Baron could leave the Exchequer in one of three situations; resignation, death, or appointment to another court, which automatically made their office void. The letters patent expired after the death of each monarch; when the new one was crowned, a Baron would have to receive a new patent or leave his office. This was mostly a routine event; from 1550 to 1714 all but nine continued in office after the crowning of a new monarch.

=== Remembrancer ===
The King's Remembrancer was the chief clerk of the Exchequer, handling all bills of equity. He was the equivalent of the Court of Chancery's Master of the Rolls, in that he headed up the clerical side of the court. As well as his duties to the judicial body, the King's Remembrancer also handled the revenue side of the Exchequer, a jurisdiction established in the 14th century. He was originally able to appoint all the sworn clerks, but by the 16th century this jurisdiction had been limited to appointing one of the 24 side clerks, with the sworn clerks appointing the rest. In a similar way, while he was originally in charge of the court's records and the enrolment of writs, by the 17th century he no longer possessed the keys to the record office, and the sworn clerks had the exclusive right to search the records. His main job was instead quasi-judicial, examining certain witnesses, taking minutes in court and settling disputes over "scandal and impertinence".

The Remembrancer was appointed for life, and qualified to appoint a deputy, the first of whom, John West, was appointed by Sir Christopher Hatton in 1616. From 1565 until 1716, the office was kept in the Fanshawe family, starting with Henry Fanshawe and ending with Simon Fanshawe. After 1820, the Remembrancer's broad duties were split up by the Court of Exchequer (England) etc. Act 1820. To replace him, two masters were appointed, one of whom was to be the accountant general. These officials were to be appointed by the Chief Baron of the Exchequer from barristers of five years standing, holding offices during good behaviour and unable to appoint a deputy. The masters handled the taking of minutes previously undertaken by the Remembrancer, with the accountant general overseeing all money paid into the court, which was deposited in the Bank of England; previously the Remembrancer had held complete discretion as to what to do with the money.

=== Other offices ===
Other offices included the sworn clerks, the examiners, the clerk to the barons, and the clerk to the King's Remembrancer. There were eight sworn clerks, so called because they were sworn officers of the court, who held their offices for life and worked under the Remembrancer. Each clerk acted as an attorney for the parties in court, and every party was required to employ one. The first clerk was known as the First Secondary, and administered oaths out of the Red Book of the Exchequer. The sworn clerks were assisted by 24 side clerks, of whom each sworn clerk appointed three. Each side clerk studied under a sworn clerk for five years before practising himself, although under the sworn clerk's name. A side clerk had the chance of being promoted to sworn clerk, first by the Remembrancer and then by the sworn clerks themselves. The examiners were tasked with supervising depositions of witnesses, bringing the witness to a Baron, administering the oath and keeping the files of the depositions.

In 1624 it was decided these examiners should be sworn officers of the court, and from then on each Baron had an examiner, who acted in the Baron's name. The office of examiner was dissolved in 1841, when the equity jurisdiction of the Exchequer came to an end. In addition to an examiner, each Baron had at least one clerk, who acted as their private secretary; although not paid, they were authorised to take fees for their work. The Chief Baron had two clerks, while the puisne Barons had one each. The King's Remembrancer also employed a clerk, who was also a secretary. He received no salary and was not a sworn officer of the court, meaning the Remembrancer could have him replaced at any time.

== See also ==
- Court of equity
- Baron of the Exchequer
- Chief Baron of the Exchequer
- Court of Exchequer (Scotland)
- Exchequer of Ireland
- List of lord high treasurers of England and Great Britain

== Bibliography ==
- Baker, J.H. (2002). An Introduction to English Legal History. Butterworths. ISBN 0-406-93053-8.
- Brougham, Henry (1828). Present State of the Law. Lea & Carey. OCLC 213519284.
- Bryson, W.H. (2008). The Equity Side of the Exchequer. Cambridge University Press. ISBN 978-0-521-07659-3.
- Fritze, Ronald H.; William Baxter Robison (2002). Historical dictionary of late medieval England, 1272–1485. Greenwood Publishing Group. ISBN 0-313-29124-1.
- "The Barons of the Exchequer". The Green Bag. George Mason University School of Law. 1899. ISSN 1095-5216.
- Gross, Charles (1909). "The Jurisdiction of the Court of Exchequer under Edward I". Law Quarterly Review. 25 (144). Sweet & Maxwell. ISSN 0023-933X.
- Guth, Delloyd (2008). Tudor Rule and Revolution: Essays for G R Elton from His American Friends. Cambridge University Press. ISBN 978-0-521-09127-5.
- Kemp, Brian (1973). "Exchequer and Bench in the Later Twelfth Century – Separate or Identical Tribunals?". The English Historical Review. 88 (348). Oxford University Press: 559–573. doi:10.1093/ehr/lxxxviii.cccxlviii.559. ISSN 0013-8266.
- Kerly, Duncan (1890). An historical sketch of the equitable jurisdiction of the Court of Chancery. Cambridge University Press. OCLC 213543694.
- Lobban, Michael (Spring 2004). "Preparing for Fusion: Reforming the Nineteenth-Century Court of Chancery, Part I". Law and History Review. 22 (2). University of Illinois Press. ISSN 0738-2480.
- Lodge, Eleanor Constance (1935). English constitutional documents, 1307–1485. Cambridge University Press. OCLC 475943496.
- Mackay, James (2002). Halsbury's Laws of England. Vol. 10 (4th ed.). LexisNexis. ISBN 90-411-1742-3.
- Palmer, Robert C. (2002). Selling the church: the English parish in law, commerce, and religion, 1350–1550. University of North Carolina Press. ISBN 0-8078-2743-6.
- Thomas, F.S. (1848). The Ancient Exchequer of England; the Treasury; and Origin of the Present Management of the Exchequer and Treasury of Ireland. John Petheram. OCLC 465938569.
- Vincent, Nicholas (1993). "The Origins of the Chancellorship of the Exchequer". The English Historical Review. 108 (426). Oxford University Press: 105–121. doi:10.1093/ehr/cviii.426.105. ISSN 0013-8266.
