= Claver Morris =

English doctor and diarist

Claver Morris (1659–1727) was a 17th and 18th century medical doctor and talented amateur musician who lived and worked in Wells, Somerset. He is noted for his frank and animated diaries.

== Background ==
Claver Morris was the son of William Morris, a clergyman of Manstone, Dorset. He was educated at New Inn Hall, Oxford, graduating with a BA in 1679, MA in 1682, BMed in 1685 and DMed in 1691. He became an extra licentiate of the College of Physicians in 1683. Morris initially practised in Salisbury before moving to Wells in 1686.

== The Diaries ==
Morris's diaries cover the period from 1684 to 1726 and record his widespread medical practice in Wells, Somerset, and the surrounding area. They also record his landed interests in Baltonsborough, West Bradley, West Pennard, and elsewhere, and his part in the enclosures of Baltonsborough Northwood and of Glastonbury Common Moor.

The diaries and accounts are contained in three manuscript volumes covering the period 1684 to 1726. The earliest volume records receipts and payments for the period 1684 to 1697, and the second volume records receipts and payments for 1709 to 1723, as well as diary entries for 1709 to 1710. The third volume, regarded as the most important as an historical source, contains diary entries only and covers the period 1718 to 1726.

== Music ==
Morris was also a gifted amateur musician and was the founder of the Wells Music Club which met at Wells Cathedral's Close Hall. In this he played an important role in the development of Wells' deep association with music now continued by Wells Cathedral School. Morris's diaries relate how the number of musicians greatly increased during the quarter sessions, and include details of the public concerts, or 'musical gatherings' as he termed them, which his club gave for an admission charge of 2s 6d.

The house that he built in Wells in 1699 is now part of Wells Cathedral School and is still known as Claver Morris House.

== Family life ==
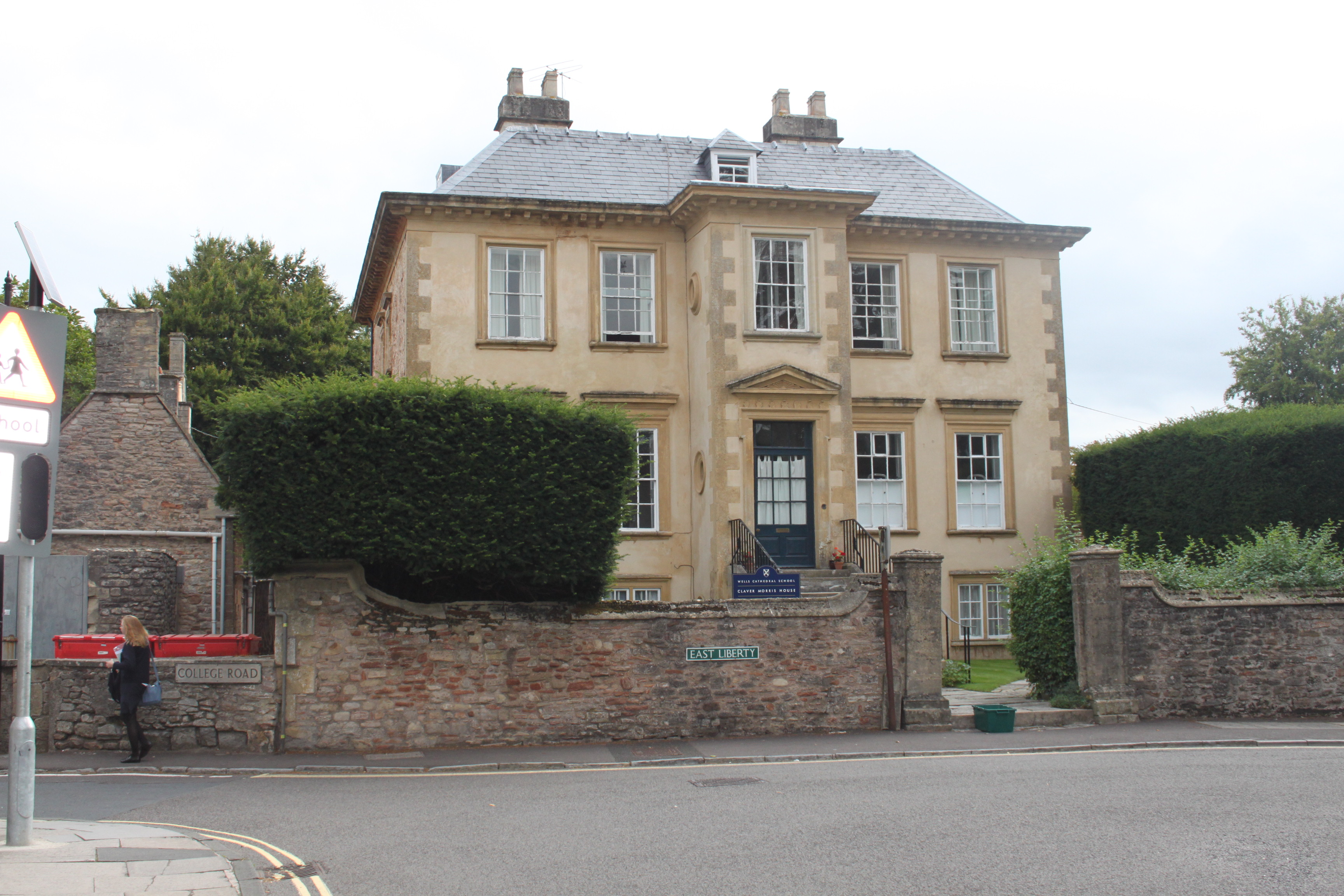
Dr. Claver Morris' House

Morris married three times, first in 1685 to Grace Greene, who died in 1689, by whom he had a daughter Elizabeth, second in 1696 to Elizabeth Dawe, who died in 1699, by whom he had three children, Mary (who died in 1706), William and Hannah, and third in 1703 to Mary Bragge who died in 1725.

In 1701 Morris purchased a highly sophisticated wax baby doll for Elizabeth with "an invention to make it cry and turn its eyes". Elizabeth married John Burland of Steyning, and their son was the judge Sir John Burland.

Claver's son, William, was educated at Sherborne and Balliol College, Oxford, however his health was always poor and he died in 1739 at the age of 30.
