= Richard Banks =

Richard Banks may refer to:

- Richard C. Banks (1931–2021), American zoologist
- Richard E. Banks (1794–1856), American physician and surgeon
- Billy Williams (music hall performer) (Richard Isaac Banks, 1878–1915), Australian musician
- Richard Banks (banker) (born 1952), British banker

== See also ==
- Ralph Richard Banks (born 1964), professor at Stanford Law School
- Richard Banke (fl. 1410), English judge
