= John Throckmorton =

John Throckmorton may refer to:

- Sir John Throckmorton (died 1580) (by 1524–1580), lawyer and MP for Leicester, Camelford, Warwick, Old Sarum, and Coventry
- John L. Throckmorton, US Army general
- John Throckmorton (MP for Worcestershire) (died 1445), MP for Worcestershire in 1414, 1420, 1422, 1433 and 1439;
- John Throckmorton (of Lypiatt) (1572–1623), MP for Gloucestershire in 1601 and 1604
- John Throckmorton (settler) (1601–1684), early settler of Providence Plantation
- Sir John Throckmorton (died 1624), English soldier and governor of Vlissingen
