= Judge Drayton =

Judge Drayton may refer to:

- John Drayton (1766–1822), judge of the United States District Court for the District of South Carolina
- William Drayton Sr. (1732–1790), chief justice of the British American Province of East Florida and judge of the United States District Court for the District of South Carolina

== See also ==
- Boston Jenkins Drayton (1821–1865), 3rd Chief Justice of Liberia
- Nicholas de Drayton (fl. 1376), English ecclesiastic and judge
