= John Hullock =

English judge

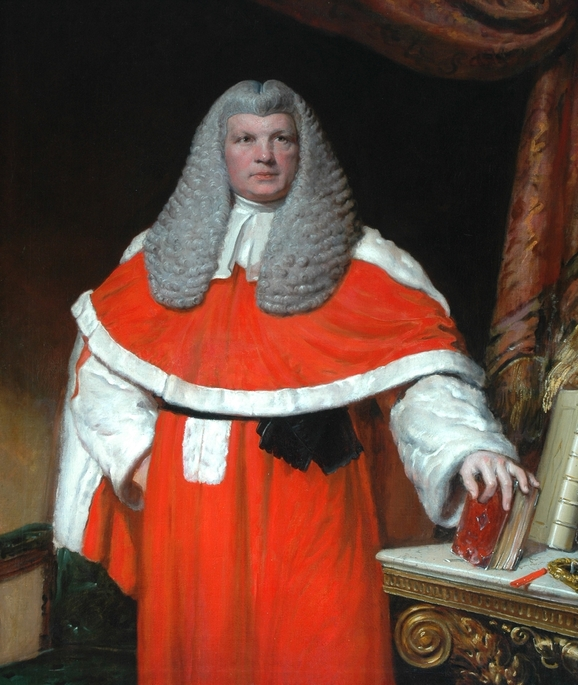
Sir John Hullock (attrib. Samuel Drummond; property of The Bowes Museum)

Sir John Hullock (3 April 1767 – 31 July 1829) was an English lawyer and judge, a baron of the exchequer.

== Early life ==
Hullock was the son of Timothy Hullock, a master weaver and proprietor of a timber-yard at Barnard Castle in County Durham. In early life he is said to have been articled to an attorney at Stokesley in the North Riding of Yorkshire. He was admitted to Gray's Inn in May 1788, and became a pupil of George Sowley Holroyd.

== Barrister ==
Called to the bar in May 1794, Hullock joined the northern circuit, and gradually acquired a practice. He was recorder of Berwick for several years, succeeded in 1816 by Christopher Cookson.

Hullock was made a Serjeant at Law on 18 June 1816. With James Scarlett, John Cross and Joseph Littledale he conducted the prosecution on behalf of the Crown against Henry Hunt and his associates at Manchester in March 1820. In July of the same year he took part in the proceedings against John Baird and Andrew Hardie at Stirling. Hullock advised Sir William Rae on English law; this was in spite of the objection of Francis Jeffrey, for the defence, that he was not qualified to appear.

== Later life ==
On the resignation of Sir George Wood, Hullock was appointed a baron of the exchequer, took his seat on the bench for the first time on 16 April 1823, and was knighted on 21 April. After holding the office of judge for little more than six years he fell suddenly ill while on circuit, and, dying at Abingdon on 31 July 1829, aged 65, was buried in the family vault at Barnard Castle. His widow survived him many years, and died on 18 November 1852.

== Works ==
In 1792 Hullock published The Law of Costs (London, 2 vols.), a second edition of which appeared in 1810 (London, 2 vols.)

== Notes ==
Attribution

This article incorporates text from a publication now in the public domain: Lee, Sidney, ed. (1891). "Hullock, John". Dictionary of National Biography. Vol. 28. London: Smith, Elder & Co.
