= Robert Graham (judge) =

English judge

The Right Honourable Sir Robert Graham
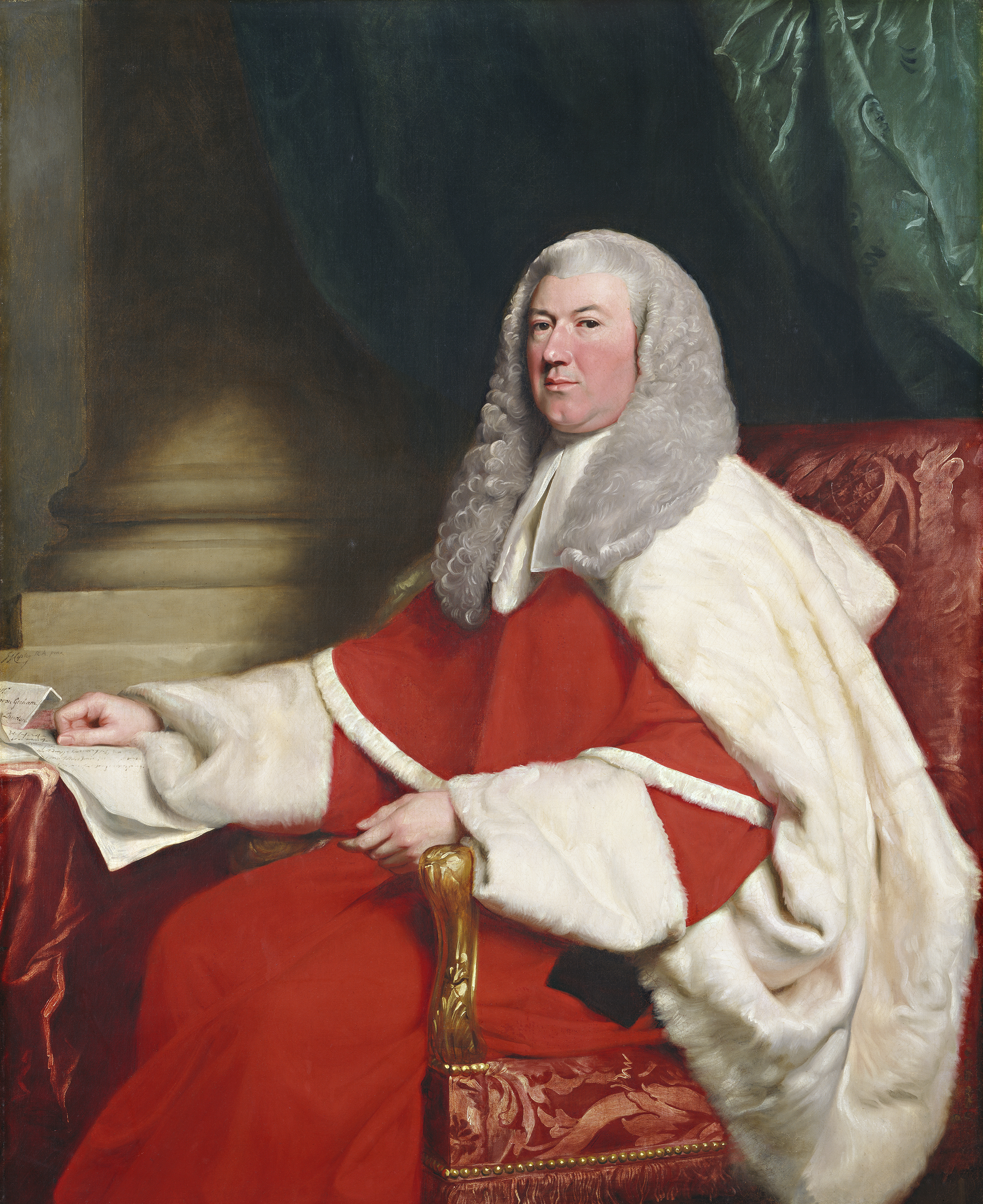

Baron of the Exchequer

Sir Robert Graham (14 October 1744 – 28 September 1836) was an English judge.

Graham was a fellow of Trinity College, Cambridge and a member of the Inner Temple. He was attorney-general to George, Prince of Wales in 1793.

He was appointed a Baron of the Exchequer in 1799 and was knighted in 1800. Retiring in 1827, he was sworn of the Privy Council the next year.
