= William Banister (judge) =

British judge and barrister

Sir William Banister (1651/1652 - 1721) was a British judge.

Banister was a student of the Middle Temple, and received the coif in 1706. For a few years he was one of the judges of South Wales, and through the friendship of Lord Chancellor Harcourt was promoted in June 1713 to be a Baron of the Exchequer, when he was knighted.

On the accession of George I, Lord Chancellor Cowper, in his proposals for reforming the judicial staff, advised the removal of Banister as being "a man not at all qualified for the place", and on 14 October 1714 he was accordingly removed as part of the replacement of Tories with Whigs.

The village of Turkdean in Gloucestershire "descended to him from his ancestors," and he possessed "a great estate in this and other places". He died at Turk Dean on 21 January 1721 at age 69, and was buried in the parish church, where there is a memorial to him. In his will, he noted his two daughters, Jane Hamilton (married to John Hamilton) and his unmarried daughter Elizabeth, both from his marriage to his wife Lady Elizabeth Banister. He also preferred to spell his surname as Banastre.
