= Baron of the Exchequer =

Judges of the English court

The Court of Exchequer
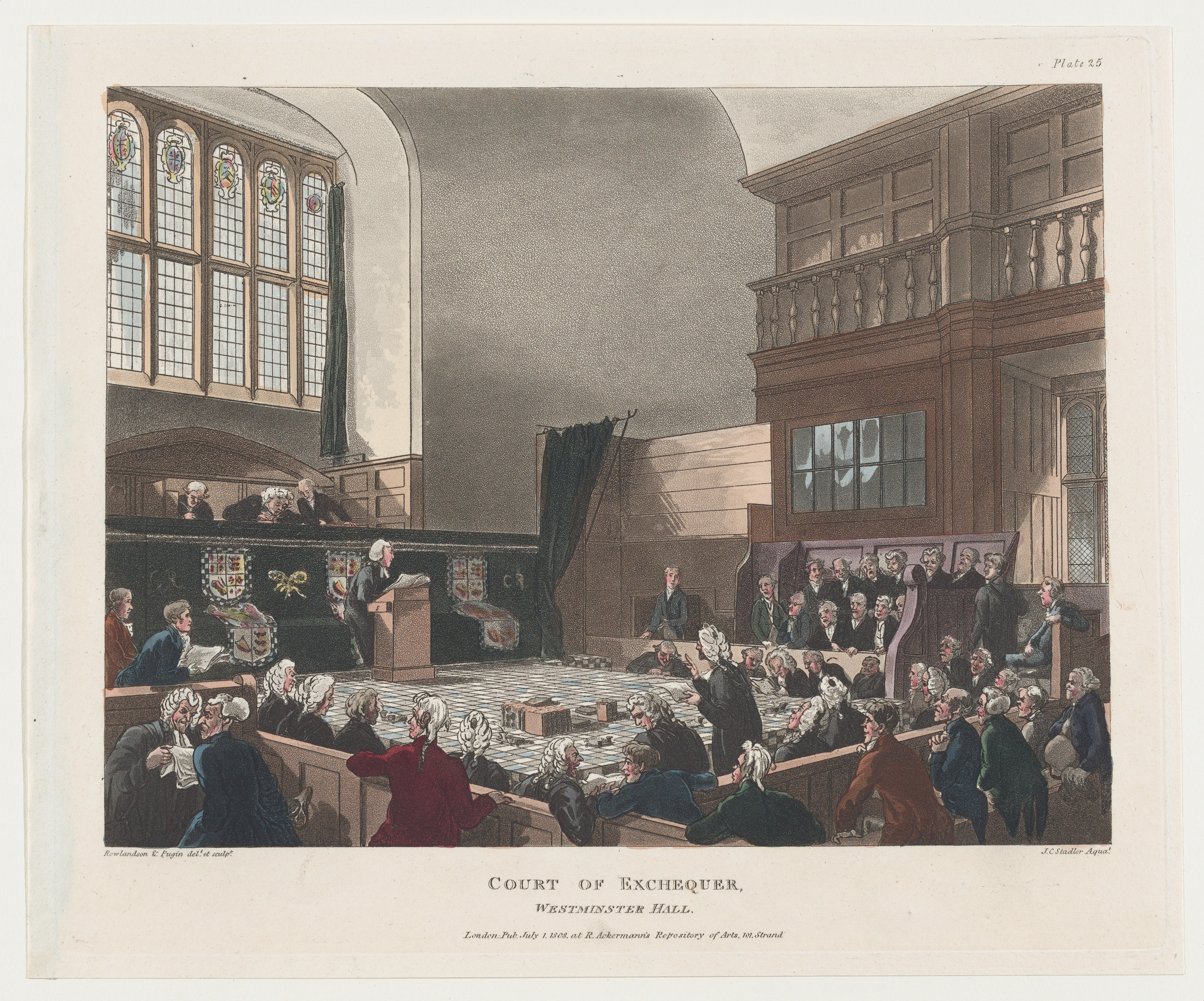
- Court of Exchequer, Westminster Hall
- Jurisdiction: England
- Location: Westminster
- Composition method: by appointment only
- Authorised by: Constitutional Monarchy
- Number of positions: 5

Chief Baron of Exchequer

The Barons of the Exchequer, or barones scaccarii, were the judges of the English court known as the Exchequer of Pleas. The Barons consisted of a Chief Baron of the Exchequer and several puisne (inferior) barons. When Robert Shute was appointed second baron in June 1579 the patent declared "he shall be reputed and be of the same order, rank, estimation, dignity and pre-eminence to all intents and purposes as any puisne judge of either of the two other courts." Exchequer of Pleas cases were formally taken by the Chancellor of the Exchequer, but in practice were heard by the Barons of the Exchequer.

The rise of commercial trade in Elizabethan England occasioned fraudulent application of the Quo minus writ. More taxation demanded staff at the exchequer to sift an increase in the case load causing more widespread litigation cases to come to the court. From the 1580s onwards the Barons of Exchequer were no longer held in such low regard, and more likely to be Serjeants-at-law before qualification. The Inns of Courts began to exclude solicitors, and held posts for judges and barons open equally to barristers. In 1591, Regulations reflected a case in which the Lord Keeper Egerton banned solicitors from seeking cases in the Exchequer.

Together they sat as a court of common law, heard suits in the court of equity, and settled revenue disputes. A puisne baron was styled "Mr Baron X" and the chief baron as "Lord Chief Baron X".

They were originally the same judges as those of the Court of King's Bench, only becoming independent positions after the Exchequer's separation from the curia regis. In the early years of the Exchequer's existence, the Barons were the chief auditors of the accounts of England, a role passed to dedicated auditors during the reign of Edward II. With the Exchequer's expansion during the Tudor era, the Barons became more important; where previously only the Chief Baron had been appointed from the serjeants-at-law, with the other Barons mere barristers, it became practice for all Barons of the Exchequer to be Serjeants. This further increased the Exchequer's standing, since for the first time it put the Exchequer at the same level as the Court of Common Pleas and Court of King's Bench, where all judges were already required to be Serjeants. Prior to the changes of 1533, Serjeants held precedence over barons "sitting in the high court,...of great eminence". Thereafter they held the degree of coif to qualify at the Inns of Court as the senior court at Westminster.

From 1550 to 1579, there was a major distinction between the chief baron and the second, third and fourth puisne barons. The difference was in social status and education. All of the chief barons had been trained as lawyers in the Inns of Court. With the exception of Henry Bradshaw and Sir Clement Higham, both barristers-at-law, all of the chief barons who served Elizabeth I, had attained the highest and most prestigious rank of a lawyer, serjeant-at-law. By 1841, the equitable jurisdiction was transferred to the Court of Chancery, which deals with pecuniary cases.

== History ==
By 1272, individuals were nominated to the office of Baron of the Exchequer from time to time: 24 baronial justiciers were appointed by the end of Henry III's reign. From 1278, there were three Barons, with a fourth being appointed in 1296 and a fifth in 1299. By 1308, one of the Barons was recognised as Capitalem Baronem (Chief Baron). Edward I commanded the Exchequer sessions to be held at Hilary term. By the reforms of the reign of King Richard II, barons were not necessarily qualified special pleaders or serjeants; office was in the gift of the king, and barons were not usually permitted to refuse appointment. From then until 1478, it was recognised that there should be four puisne Barons. One was frequently named as Second Baron and rarely appointments were named as Third Baron and Fourth Baron. From then until 1547, the three puisne barons were always appointed to numbered offices, but in 1549, Edward Saxleby as successor to John Darnall was merely appointed as 'one of the Barons of the Exchequer'. However, he and his successors held the office of Cursitor Baron. An additional Baron was appointed in 1604. The number of puisnes generally remained at three until the 19th century, but there was a fourth from 1708 to 1725 due to John Smith having leave of absence to attend to the office of a Baron of the Scottish Exchequer. A fourth puisne baron was appointed in 1830 and a fifth in 1868.

== Puisne barons ==
- 1272/3–1283: Roger de la Leye
- 1272/3–1277: Hervey de Boreham
- 1273/4: Walter de Hopton
- 1273/4–1285/6: Roger de Northwood
- 1273/4: John de St Valerico
- 1274/5–1283/4: Philip de Wileby
- 1275/6–1299: John de Cobbeham
- 1283/4–1290/1: Peter de Chester
- 1284/5: William de Middleton
- 1290/1–1307: William de Carleton later Chief Baron of the Exchequer
- 1290/1: Peter de Leicester
- 1294–1312: John de Everdon
- 1295–1307; 1313–1320: John de Insula
- 1297/8–1307: Roger de Hegham
- 1299–1317: Richard de Abyngdon
- 1306–1307; 1324–1327: Humfrey de Waledene
- 1307–1310: Thomas de Cantebrig
- 1307–1308: John de Bankwell
- 1307–1323: John de Everdon
- 1308–1317: Richard de Abyngdon
- 1309–: John de Foxle
- 1310–: Roger de Scotre
- 1311: Walter de Gloucester
- 1311–1314: Walter de Norwich
- 1314–1316: Hervey de Staunton
- 1315–1320: John Abel (for a second time)
- 1316–1318: Ingelard de Warlee
- 1317–: John de Oakham
- 1318–1323: Robert de Wodehouse
- 1320–1324: Lambert de Trikingham
- 1320–: Walter de Friskeney
- 1322–1326: Roger Beler
- 1323–1327: William de Fulburn
- 1323–: Edmund de Passele
- 1324–1332: Robert de Ayleston
- 1324–1336: William de Everdon
- 1324–: Humfrey de Waledene
- 1326–: John de Radeswell
- Feb 4, 1327 – Oct 15, 1327: William de Boudon
- 1327–: Robert de Nottingham
- 1329–1331: Robert de Wodehouse
- 1330–1332: Robert de Aylston
- 1330–1344: William de Cossale
- 1331–1332: Thomas de Garton
- 1332–: Adam de Steyngrave
- 1332–: William de Denum
- 1332–: Thomas de Blaston
- 1332–1336: Robert de Scorburgh
- 1332–1334: John de Hildesley
- 1334–: Adam de Lymbergh
- 1336–: Nicholas de Haghman
- 1336–: John de Shordich
- 1339–1340: William de la Pole
- 1340–: William de Northwell
- 1341–: William de Broclesby
- 1341–1350: Gervase de Wilford
- 1344–1352: Alan de Ashe
- 1346–1348: William de Stowe
- 1347–1357: John de Houghton
- 1350–: James Huse
- 1352–1356: William de Thorpe
- 1354–1375: William de Retford
- 1356–1365: Henry de Greystock
- 1357–1362: John de Bukyngham
- 1362–1373: Robert de Pleste
- 1365–1375: Almaric de Shirland
- 1365–1376: John de Stokes
- 1373–: William Gunthorp
- 1374–1377: John de Blockley
- 1375–1377: John Penros
- 1375–1401: Laurence de Allerthorpe
- Jun 1377 – Oct 1377: Henry de Percehay
- 1377–?: Nicholas de Drayton
- 1383–1386: Robert de Plessyngton
- 1384–1403: William Ford
- 1389–1394: William Dounebrigge
- 1393–1399: Ralph de Selby
- 1399–1401: Thomas Ferriby
- 1399: John Staverton
- 1401–1403: Thomas de Tuttlebury
- 1401–1402: William Ermyn
- 1402–1412: Thomas Overton
- 1403–1423: Roger Westwode
- 1407: Henry Merston
- 1407–1423: Henry Somer
- 1410–1416: Richard Banke
- 1413–1422: Robert Malton
- 1421–1424: William Hesill
- 1423–1448: Nicholas Dixon
- 1423–: Thomas Banstre
- 1424–: Thomas Banke
- 26 May 1426–1 Oct 1426: William Ward
- 1426–1435: John Fray
- 1435–1438: William Derby
- 1436–1453: William Fallan
- 1438–1444: Roger Hunt
- 1438–1449: Thomas Levesham
- 1444–1456: Robert Frampton
- 1446–1449: John Holme
- 1447–1449: Gilbert Haltoft
- 1449–1470: John Durem
- 1453–1461: Thomas Thorpe
- 1458–70; 1471–94: Brian Roucliffe
- 1460–1470; 1471–81: John Clerke
- 1462–1467; 1470–1471: John Ingoldesby
- 1467–70; 1478–83: Ralph Wolseley
- 1467–: Nicholas Statham
- 1481–1483: Thomas Whitington
- 1483–1494: Edward Goldsburgh
- 1484–1487: John Holgrave
- 1487–1502: Nicholas Lathell
- 1488–1504: Thomas Roche
- 1494–1496: Thomas Barnewell
- 1496–1501: Andrew Dymock
- 1501–1521: Bartholomew Westby
- 1502–1513: William Bolling
- 1504–1513: John Alleyn
- 1511–1523: Robert Blagge
- 1513–1522: Edmund Denny
- 1521–1527: William Wotton
- 1522–1539: John Hales
- 1523–1536: William Ellis
- 1527–1538: John Petit
- 1528–1532: John Scott
- 1532–1538: John Petit
- 1536–1542: Thomas Walshe
- 1538–1540: John Danaster
- 1539–1547: John Smith
- 1540–1549: Nicholas Luke
- 1542–1545: Lewis Fortescue
- 1545–1548: John Pilborough
- 1547–1550: Robert Curson
- 1548–1549: John Darnall
- 1549–1562: Edward Saxilby
- 1550–1558: Robert Brown
- 1559–1579: George Frevile
- 1562–1566: Thomas Pymme
- 1564–1572: John Birch
- 1566–1576: James Lord
- 1576–1577: Thomas Greek
- 1577–1579: Christopher Muschampe
- 1579–1586: Robert Shute of Hockington, co. Cambridge
- 1579–1606: John Sotherton
- 1581–1584: John Clench
- 1584–1587: Edward Flowerdew
- 1586–1594: Thomas Gent
- 1587–1607: Robert Clarke
- 1594–1598: Matthew Ewens
- 1598–1607: Sir John Savile
- 1604–1625: George Snigg
- 1607–1617: Sir James Altham
- 1607–1610: Edward Heron
- 1610–1627: Edward Bromley
- 1617–1639: John Denham
- 1625–: Thomas Trevor
- 1627–1631: George Vernon
- 1631–1634: James Weston
- 1634–: Richard Weston
- 1639–1642: Edward Henden
- 1645–1659; 1660–1670: Edward Atkyns
- 1648–: Thomas Gates
- 1655: Robert Nicolas
- 1656: John Parker
- 1657: Roger Hill
- 1660–1675: Christopher Turnor
- 1663–1670: Sir Richard Raynsford
- 1670–1679: Timothy Lyttelton
- 1670–1673: Hugh Wyndham
- 1673–1679: Edward Thurland
- 1675–1678: Vere Bertie
- 1678–1679: Francis Bramston
- 1679–1686: William Gregory
- 1679–1686: Sir Edward Atkyns
- 8 May 1679 – 22 June 1679: William Leeke
- 1679–1680: Thomas Raymond
- 1680–1681: Richard Weston
- 1681–1684: Sir Thomas Street
- 1684–1685: Sir Robert Wright
- 1685–1691: Edward Nevill
- 1686–1688: Thomas Jenner
- 1686–1689: Richard Heath
- 1686–: Christopher Milton
- 1687–1688: Thomas Powell
- 1688–1689: Charles Ingleby
- 1688–1689: John Rotherham
- 1689–1700: Sir Nicholas Lechmere
- 1689–1696: John Turton
- 1691–1695: Sir John Powell junior
- 1695–1701: Sir Littelton Powys
- 1696–1697: Sir John Blencowe
- 1697–1702: Henry Hatsel
- 1700–1702: Robert Tracy
- 1701–1716: Sir Thomas Bury later Chief Baron of the Exchequer
- 1702–1708: John Smith
- 1702–1726: Sir Robert Price
- 1702–1714: Sir William Bannister
- 1727–1736: Sir John Comyns
- 1714–1722: Sir James Montagu later Chief Baron of the Exchequer
- 1717–1718: Sir John Fortescue-Aland
- 1718–1726: Francis Page
- 1722–1725: Sir Jeffery Gilbert later Lord Chief Baron of the Exchequer
- 1725–1729: Bernard Hale
- 1726–1745: Sir Lawrence Carter
- 1726–1736: John Comyns
- 1729–1739: Sir William Thomson
- 1736–1738: William Fortescue
- 1738–1740: Sir Thomas Parker later Chief Baron of the Exchequer
- 1739–1740: Martin Wright
- 1740–1747: James Reynolds
- 1740–1742: Thomas Abney
- 1742–1750: Charles Clarke
- 1745–1753: Edward Clive
- 1747–1759: Heneage Legge
- 1750–1772: Sir Sydney Stafford Smythe
- 1753–: Richard Adams
- 1759–1761: Sir Richard Lloyd
- 1761–: Henry Gould
- 1763–: George Perrot
- 1772–1787: Sir James Eyre later Chief Baron
- 1774–1776: Sir John Burland
- 1775–1805: Beaumont Hotham, 2nd Baron Hotham
- 1776–1799: Richard Perryn
- 1787–1826: Alexander Thomson
- 1799–1800: Alan Chambre
- 1800–1827: Sir Robert Graham
- 1805–1807: Thomas Manners-Sutton, 1st Baron Manners
- 1807–1823: George Wood
- 1814–1817: Sir Richard Richards later Chief Baron
- 1817–1832: William Garrow
- 1823–1829: John Hullock
- 1827–1834: John Vaughan
- 1829–1839: William Bolland
- 1830–1834: Sir John Bayley, 1st Baronet
- 1832–1845: Sir John Gurney
- 1834–1855: Sir James Parke
- 1834–1857: Sir Edward Alderson
- Feb 1, 1839 – Nov 29, 1839: William Henry Maule
- 1839–1850: Sir Robert Monsey Rolfe
- 1845–1856: Sir Thomas Joshua Platt
- 1850–1873: Sir Samuel Martin
- 1856–1876: Sir George Bramwell
- 1856–1860: Sir William Henry Watson
- 1857–1873: Sir William Fry Channell
- 1863–1875: Sir Gillery Pigott

== Cursitor baron ==
- 1606–1610: Nowell Sotherton
- 26 May 1610 – 18 July 1610: Thomas Caesar
- 1610–1631: John Sotherton
- 1631–1638: James Paget
- 1638–: John William Page
- 1638–1653; 1654–1685: William Barker of New Prison Walk and Hurst, Berkshire
- 1640–1645; 1660–1663: Thomas Leeke
- 1645–: Richard Tomlins
- 1663–1683: Sir Clement Spelman
- 1679–1683: Francis Crawley
- 1683–1685: Richard May
- 1685–1688: William Carr
- 1689–1696: George Bradbury
- 1696–1697: Richard Wallop
- 1697–1726: William Simpson
- 1726–1729: William Thomson
- 1729–1735: John Birch
- 1735–1740: George Clive
- 1740–1744: William Kynaston
- 1744–1755: Edward Barker
- 1755–1773: John Tracy Atkins
- 1773–1824: Francis Maseres
- 1824–1852: George Bankes

== See also ==
- Chief Baron of the Exchequer
- Court of Exchequer (Scotland)
- Court of Exchequer (Ireland)
- Chief Baron of the Irish Exchequer
