= Joseph Littledale =

English judge

Sir Joseph Littledale (1767 – 26 June 1842) was an English judge.

== Life ==
He was eldest son of Henry Littledale of Eton House, Lancashire, who was of a Cumberland family. He entered St John's College, Cambridge, in 1783 and was senior wrangler and 1st Smith's prizeman in 1787. He graduated B.A. in 1787 and M.A. in 1790.

Littledale was admitted to Lincoln's Inn in 1786 but moved to Gray's Inn in 1793. He was called to the bar in 1798, and became a bencher in 1821.

Littledale joined the northern circuit, and attended the Chester sessions. In 1813 he was appointed counsel to the University of Cambridge. He enjoyed a good practice. On 30 April 1824 he was appointed, in succession to Mr. Justice Best, to a judgeship of the King's Bench Division, though beyond being appointed John Hullock's colleague in managing the government prosecutions in Scotland in 1822 he had had little official recognition to that point. He took his seat on the first day of Easter term, 5 May 1824, and was knighted on 9 June. He also became Serjeant-at-law at this point.

Littledale resigned because of failing health on 31 January 1841. He was sworn a Privy Councillor, but died shortly after at his house in Bedford Square on 26 June 1842. He left £250,000. He edited John Skelton's Magnyfycence, an Interlude for the Roxburghe Club in 1821.

== Family ==
On 26 February 1821 Littledale married Hannah Timberlake.

His only daughter, Elizabeth, married Thomas Coventry, barrister-at-law.
