= John Throckmorton (died 1624) =

English soldier and Lieutenant-Governor

Sir John Throckmorton (d. 1624) was an English soldier, Lieutenant-Governor of Flushing or Vlissingen and the Rammekens fortress. He was a son of John Throckmorton, and grandson of Sir Richard Throckmorton of Higham Ferrers.

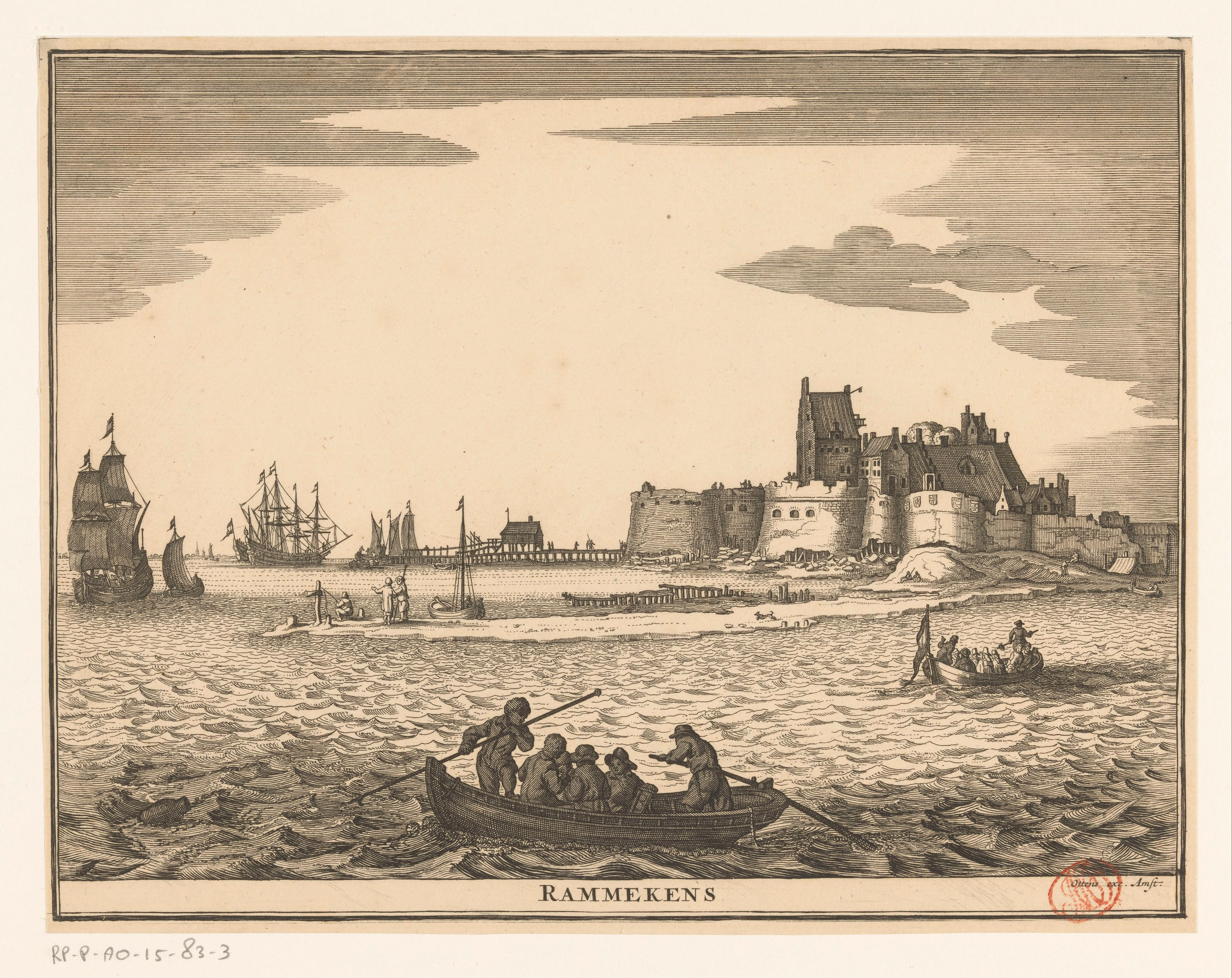
Throckmorton was commander of the Rammekens fortress at Flushing

== Career ==
He was deputy Governor of Flushing, now Vlissingen, one of the Cautionary Towns, for Viscount Lisle. The seaways around Vlissingen remained Dutch territorial waters during the English occupation. He was knighted by the king at Whitehall on 16 February 1606.

He wrote many letters to Lisle describing the business of the garrison and political news which he discussed with travelling diplomats including Robert Anstruther and Stephen Lesieur. He joked with Lisle that providing a dowry for his daughter Philippa Sidney on her marriage to Sir John Hobart would leave him out of pocket.

Throckmorton reported the arrival of the Venetian ambassador Antonio Foscarini at Vlissingen in May 1612, on his way to Brussels. Throckmorton said he was "an honest proper man, for he speaketh well of us (the English), and seemeth not to be much affected to the Spaniards". Throckmorton was uncertain how much ceremony he should to diplomats, and arranged a "fair guard" of soldiers at the gate of the fort for Foscarini.

Throckmorton's wife Dorothy was chosen after the wedding of Princess Elizabeth and Frederick V of the Palatinate in February 1613, to attend Elizabeth on her journey to Heidelberg.

In September 1613 he reported that Henry Howard, a son of the Earl of Suffolk had travelled to Veere to fight a duel with the Earl of Essex over issues concerning his sister Frances Howard, but the courtier Henry Gibb prevented the combat. Throckmorton felt that the laws of England ought to prevent such duels being fought abroad.

Throckmorton was concerned by an arms dealer Antonis Antonison, nicknamed "Moy" or handsome, who was smuggling cannon made in Cardiff against custom restrictions and selling them to the Dutch East India Company.

In May 1614 the sergeant-major Sir Michael Everard hit him. An English captain George Wood caused trouble in June 1614 by demanding that ships of other nations should salute the English flag, despite the sea roads being Dutch waters.

In February 1615 he spoke to Anne Herbert, the widow of Sir William Stanley's son, and her four daughters, who were travelling by coach from Veere to Antwerp. She said her plan was to stay near Mechelin and return to England with the Countess of Pembroke who was at Spa with her physician Matthew Lister. In July 1615 he visited England and Penshurst Place. Viscount Lisle was at court serving Anne of Denmark, and his wife Barbara entertained Throckmorton at Penshurst. He was back at Flushing in August.

John Throckmorton died at the siege of Breda in 1624.

== Marriage and family ==
John Throckmorton married twice. His first wife was Dorothy Saunder, daughter of Edmund Saunder of Firle and Philippa Gage. She died in childbirth at Vlissingen in November 1614. Their children included:

- Philippa Throckmorton, who married Sir Ferdinando Carey (1590–1638), a son of Sir Edmund Carey. Their daughters were Philadelphia Carey, Baroness Wentworth and Elisabeth Carey who married Francis Staunton and whose daughter Philippina Staunton was painted by Caspar Netscher.
- Nicholas Throckmorton, who also joined Lisle's company of soldiers in 1614. Thereafter he was part of Prince Maurits's guards at The Hague. In 1624 he eloped with Barbara Duyck, the daughter of the grand pensionary of Holland Anthonie Duyck. The pair got married in the end. After Nicholas Throckmorton died, Barbara married the English diplomat Dudley Carleton.

Throckmorton's second wife was Anne Sotherton, daughter of John Sotherton (1562–1631), a baron of the Exchequer. They married in June 1615. Their children included:

- Sir William Throckmorton, Knight Marshal to Charles II
- Francis Throckmorton of Burnebutts in Watton, Yorkshire, who married Hannah Manby
