= Sidney Smythe =

English judge and politician

Sir Sidney Stafford Smythe, PC (1705 – 2 November 1778) was an English judge and politician.

== Early life ==
Born in London, he was descended from Customer Smythe and Waller's "Sacharissa". His father, Henry Smythe of Old Bounds in the parish of Bidborough, Kent, died in 1706, aged 29. His mother, Elizabeth, the daughter of Dr. John Lloyd, canon of Windsor, then became the wife of William Hunt, and died on 6 October 1754.

Smythe was admitted to St John's College, Cambridge, as a fellow-commoner on 1 July 1721, and graduated B.A. in 1724. Having entered the Inner Temple on 5 June 1724, he was called to the bar in February 1728, and joined the home circuit. In 1740 he was appointed steward of the court of the king's palace at Westminster, in place of Sir Thomas Abney, and in Trinity term 1747 he was made a King's Counsel, and became a bencher of the Inner Temple. He was elected a Fellow of the Royal Society in 1742.

At the 1747 British general election Smythe was returned to the House of Commons for the borough of East Grinstead. He sat in the house for three sessions, and there is no record of any speech he made. In January 1749 he took part in the prosecution of the smugglers who were tried for murder before a special commission at Chichester.

== Judge ==
Smythe was appointed a baron of the exchequer in place of Charles Clarke who died in 1750. He received the order of the coif on 23 June 1750, took his seat on the bench, and on 7 November was knighted. With Heneage Legge he tried Mary Blandy at the Oxford assizes in March 1752.

While a puisne baron, Smythe was twice appointed a commissioner of the Great Seal. On the first occasion, from 19 November 1756 to 20 June 1757, he was joined in the commission with Sir John Willes and Sir John Eardley-Wilmot. On the second occasion, from 21 January 1770 to 23 January 1771, he was chief commissioner, his colleagues being Henry Bathurst and Sir Richard Aston.

Smythe succeeded Sir Thomas Parker as lord chief baron on 28 October 1772. Since Parker continued to enjoy good health after his resignation, while Smythe was often prevented by illness from attending the court, Lord Mansfield is said to have cruelly observed, "The new chief baron should resign in favour of his predecessor".

== Later life and death ==
After presiding in the exchequer for five years, Smythe was compelled in November 1777 to resign because of bad health. He was granted a pension of £2,400, and on 3 December was sworn a member of the privy council. He died at Old Bounds in Bidborough, Kent on 2 November 1778, and was buried at Sutton-at-Hone, Kent.

== Reputation ==
Smythe is said to have refused the post of Lord Chancellor, and to have been "the ugliest man of his day". He was abused in print and in parliament for his conduct of the trial of John Taylor, a sergeant of the Scots guards, for the murder of James Smith, at the Guildford summer assizes in 1770. The jury brought in a verdict of guilty, and Smythe, who had told them that it was only manslaughter, expressed surprise, and asked that a special verdict should be drawn up, which was duly signed by the jury. Smythe's conduct was vindicated by John Dunning in the House of Commons on 6 December 1770, and his decision was upheld by the judges of the King's Bench on 8 February 1771. The issue was brought up by Junius in his letter to Lord Mansfield of 21 January 1772.

== Family ==
Smythe married, in 1733, Sarah, daughter of Sir Charles Farnaby, bart., of Kippington in Kent, but left no issue. Both he and his wife took an interest in the evangelical movement. She died on 18 March 1790 and was buried at Sutton-at-Hone.

== Notes ==
Attribution

This article incorporates text from a publication now in the public domain: Lee, Sidney, ed. (1898). "Smythe, Sidney Stafford". Dictionary of National Biography. Vol. 53. London: Smith, Elder & Co.

Legal offices
Preceded by Sir Thomas Parker	Chief Baron of the Exchequer; 1772–1777	Succeeded by Sir John Skynner
