= Thomas Parker (English judge) =

English barrister and judge

Sir Thomas Parker, PC (1695–1784) was an English barrister and judge, Privy Counsellor and Lord Chief Baron of the Exchequer.

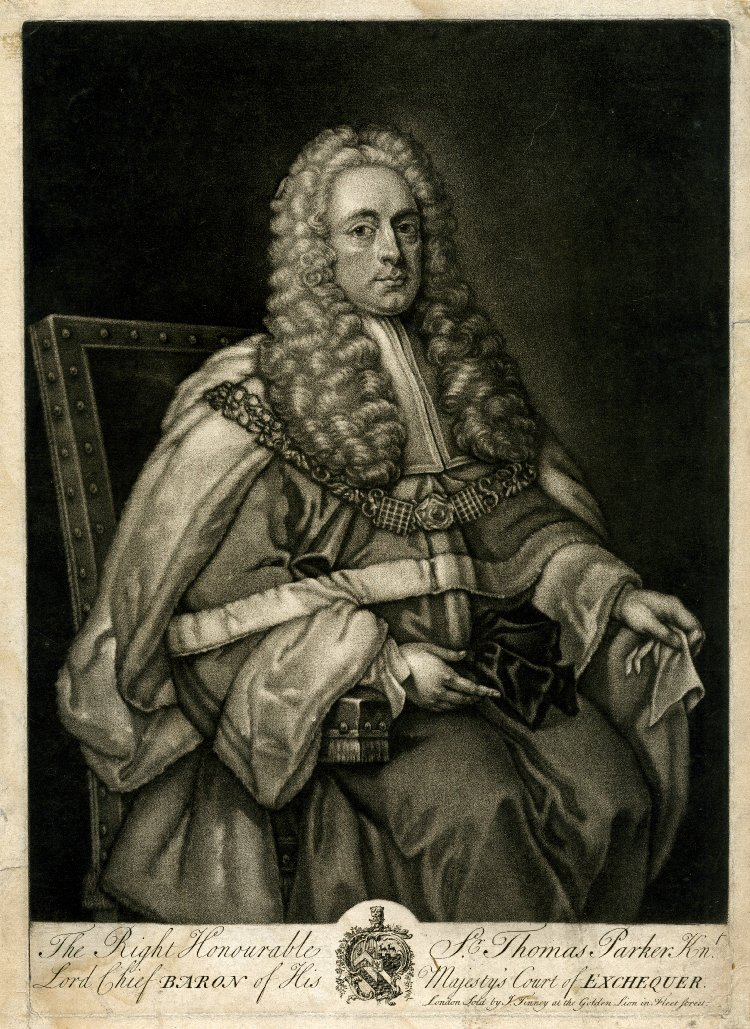
Sir Thomas Parker, Lord Chief Baron of the Exchequer

== Life ==
He was a relative of Thomas Parker, 1st Earl of Macclesfield the Lord Chancellor, came from a Staffordshire family, and was born about 1695. Educated at Lichfield Grammar School, Parker entered the office of a London solicitor, Charles Salkeld. There he had as colleagues Philip Yorke and John Strange, and Yorke used influence in Parker's favour consistently from then on.

Parker was admitted a student of the Inner Temple on 3 May 1718, called to the bar on 19 June 1724, received the degree of serjeant-at-law on 17 May 1736, and was made king's serjeant on 4 June 1736. On 7 July 1738 he was appointed a Baron of the Exchequer. On 21 April 1740 he was moved to the Court of Common Pleas, and subsequently was knighted, 27 November 1742, and returned to the court of exchequer as Lord Chief Baron on 29 November 1742. Here, though Yorke as Lord Hardwicke tried to get him the post of Chief Justice of the Common Pleas, he remained for a longer period than any of his predecessors.

In November 1772, Parker resigned on a pension of £2,400 a year, and was sworn of the privy council 20 November. He died at South Weald, Essex, on 29 December 1784, and was buried in the family vault at Park Hall, Staffordshire.

== Works ==
Parker published, in 1776, a volume of Reports of Revenue Cases, 1743 to 1767.

== Family ==
Parker married:

1. Anne, daughter of James Whitehall of Pipe Ridware, in Staffordshire, by whom he had two sons: George, the second, was father of Sir William Parker; and
2. Martha, daughter of Edward Strong of Greenwich, by whom he had two daughters. The elder daughter, Martha, married, on 5 June 1783, Sir John Jervis, and died without issue on 8 February 1816.

Legal offices
| Preceded by Sir Edmund Proby | Chief Baron of the Exchequer; 1742–1777 | Succeeded by Sir Sydney Smythe |
