= John Cross (judge) =

English judge

Sir John Cross (1766–1842) was an English judge in bankruptcy.

The second son of William Cross of Scarborough, John Cross was educated at Trinity College, Cambridge. In 1791, he entered at Lincoln's Inn, and was called to the bar on 16 November 1795. He was appointed a serjeant-at-law in Hilary term, 1819, and enjoyed a considerable practice in the Court of Common Pleas. In Trinity term, 1827, he was appointed a King's Serjeant, and he succeeded Lord Abinger in the office of Attorney-General of the Duchy of Lancaster.

On 2 December 1831, he was appointed by letters patent a judge of the Court of Bankruptcy, and was knighted. Subsequently he became Chief Judge, and held that office until 5 November 1842, when, on his return home from his court at Westminster, he suddenly died. On his death the separate Court of Bankruptcy was abolished, and its jurisdiction transferred to the Court of Chancery, Vice-chancellor Sir James Knight-Bruce becoming chief judge.
