= John Burland (judge) =

Sir John Burland (1724–1776), DCL was an 18th-century lawyer, judge and one of the Barons of the Court of Exchequer.

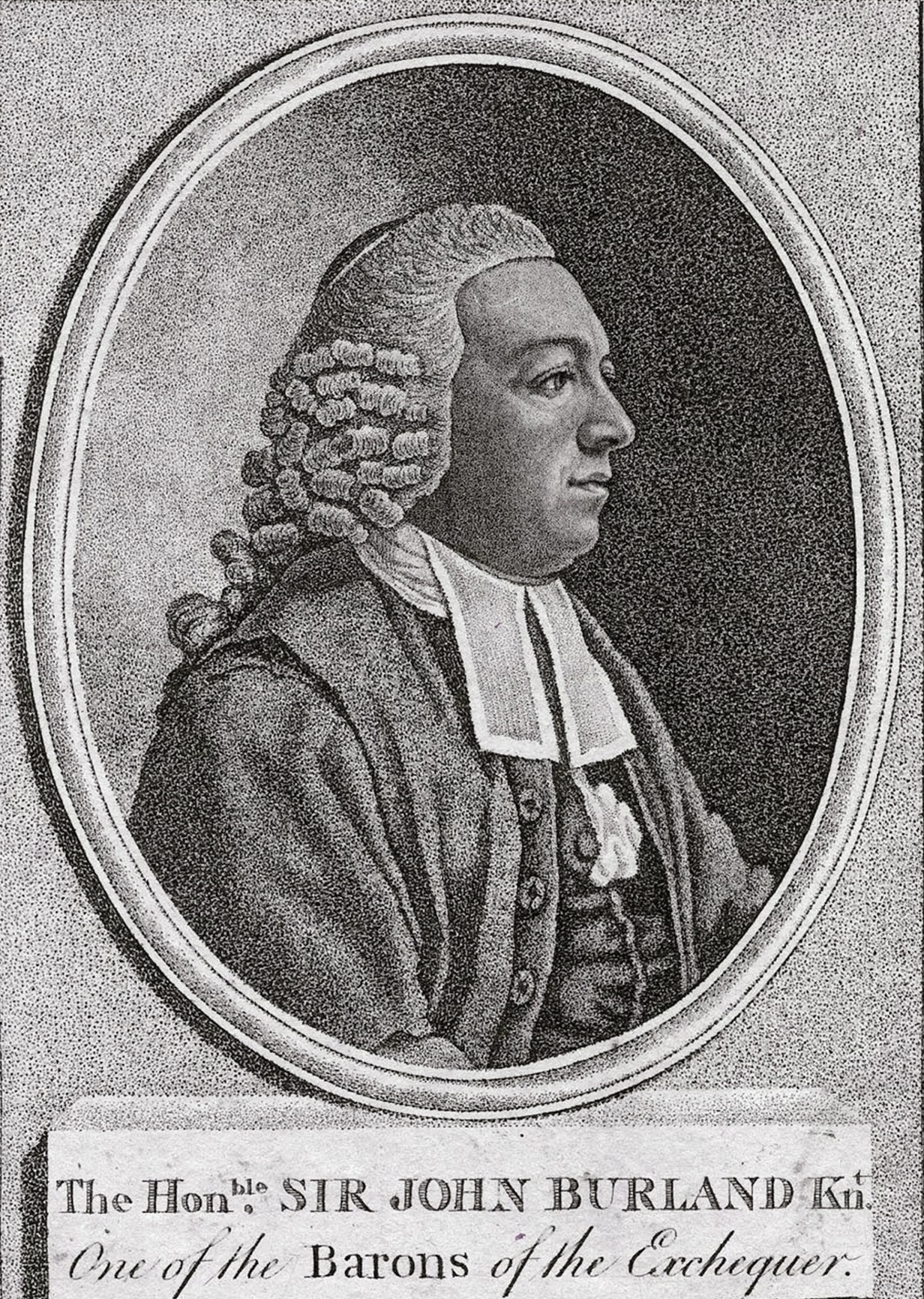
Sir John Burland, (1725–1776), son of John Burland of Wells, Somerset, Balliol College, Oxford, judge.

== Background ==
Sir John Burland was born at Wells in Somerset on 10 July 1724, the eldest surviving son of John Burland of Steyning, Somerset, (1696–1746) and his wife Elizabeth née Morris. He was educated at Sherborne, Balliol College, Oxford and Middle Temple.

Burland was called to the bar in January 1746 and rapidly developed a successful practice. He was appointed a Serjeant-at-Law in 1762, King's Sergeant in 1764, Recorder of Wells and a Baron of the Exchequer in 1774, upon which occasion he was knighted by King George III.

== Family ==
Sir John married Laetitia, only daughter of William Berkeley Portman, an ancestor of the Viscounts Portman, of Orchard Portman and Pylle in the county of Somerset. He left one son, John Berkeley Burland, who became MP for Totnes in 1802.

Sir John died suddenly in 1776 and is buried in the South Choir Aisle of Westminster Abbey.
