= John Skynner =

English judge and politician

Sir John Skynner, PC (1724 – 26 November 1805) was an English judge and politician who sat in the House of Commons from 1771 to 1777.

He was born in London the son of John Skynner of Great Milton, Oxfordshire and educated at Westminster School and Christ Church, Oxford, where he matriculated in 1742. He entered Lincoln's Inn in 1739 to study law and was called to the bar in 1748.

He became attorney-general to the Duchy of Lancaster from 1770 to 1777, made K.C. in 1771 and a bencher at Lincoln's Inn the same year. He was appointed recorder of Woodstock from 1771 to 1780, second justice of Chester from 1772 to 1777 and recorder of Oxford from 1776 to 1797.

He was elected Member of Parliament for New Woodstock from 1771 to 1777. He gave up his seat in 1777: he was made a serjeant-at-law on 27 November 1777 and on 1 December was appointed Chief Baron of the Exchequer, a post he held until 1787, after which he was made a Privy Counsellor. He was knighted on 23 November 1777.

He retired in 1786 to the Great House in Great Milton which had inherited from his mother. He died at Bath in 1805 and was buried in the south aisle of Great Milton church. He had married Martha, the daughter of Edward Burn, with whom he had a daughter, Frederica, who married Richard Ryder, the Home Secretary.

Parliament of Great Britain
Preceded by Lord Robert Spencer; William Gordon	Member of Parliament for Woodstock; 1771–1777; With: William Gordon 1771–1774; William Eden 1774–1777	Succeeded by Viscount Parker; William Eden
Legal offices
Preceded by Sir Sydney Smythe	Chief Baron of the Exchequer; 1777–1787	Succeeded by Sir James Eyre
Preceded by Taylor White	Puisne Justice of Chester; 1771–1777	Succeeded by Sir Francis Buller
