= John Smith (English judge) =

English barrister and judge

The Right Honourable John Smith
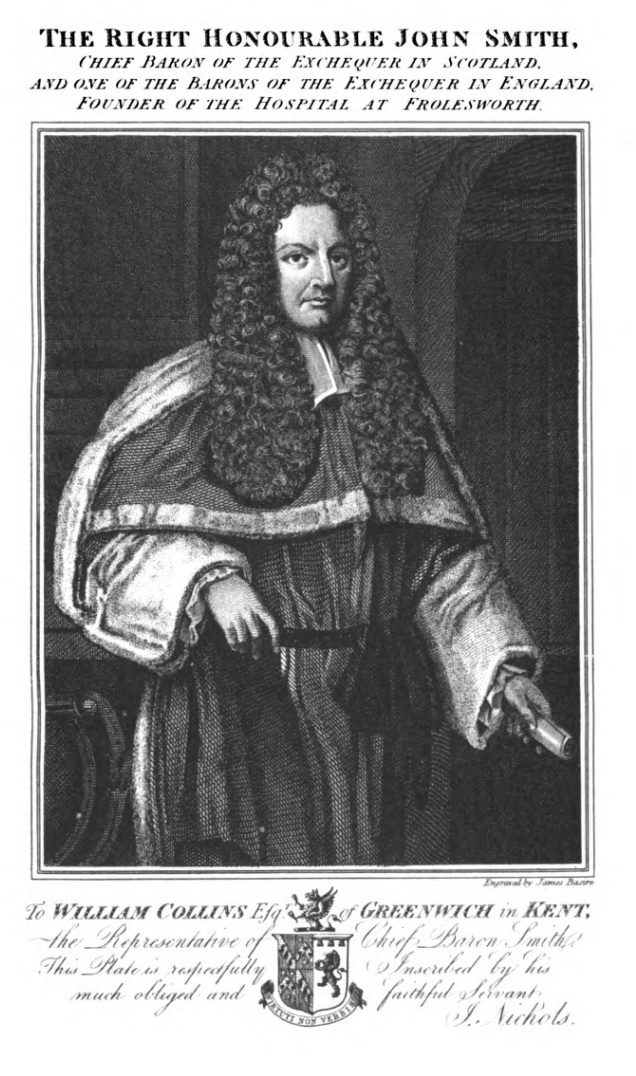

Personal details
- Born: 6 January 1657
- Died: 24 June 1726 (aged 69)

John Smith (1657–1726) was an English barrister and judge.

== Life ==
The son of Roger Smith of Frolesworth, Leicestershire, he was born on 6 January 1657, and matriculated at Lincoln College, Oxford, on 12 September 1676, at the age of 19. He entered Gray's Inn on 1 June 1678, was called to the bar on 2 May 1684, and, having been made serjeant-at-law on 30 October 1700, was appointed a justice of the Court of Common Pleas in Ireland on 24 December 1700. He was transferred to be a Baron of the Court of Exchequer in England on 24 June 1702.

In the leading case Ashby v. White (1703), arising out of the Aylesbury election, Smith gave his decision in opposition to the judgment of the majority of the court of queen's bench, and concurred in the view expressed by Lord-chief-justice Sir John Holt. It was in favour of the plaintiff Ashby whose vote the returning officer, White (the defendant), had declined to record. On appeal to the House of Lords, the judgment was reversed, and the opinion of Holt and Smith was confirmed.

In May 1708 Smith was selected to settle the Court of Exchequer in Scotland, after the union with England, and for that purpose was made Lord Chief Baron of the Exchequer in Scotland; he kept (though another baron was appointed) his place in the English court, and receiving £500 a year in addition to his salary. He was re-sworn on the accession of George I as a baron of the English exchequer, although he performed none of the duties, and enjoyed both his English and his Scottish offices until his death on 24 June 1726, at the age of 69.

== Legacy ==
Smith was a benefactor of his native village of Frolesworth. By his will, he founded and endowed a hospital for fourteen poor widows of the communion of the church of England, who were each to have £12 a year and a separate house.

== Notes ==
Attribution

This article incorporates text from a publication now in the public domain: Lee, Sidney, ed. (1898). "Smith, John (1657-1726)". Dictionary of National Biography. Vol. 53. London: Smith, Elder & Co.
