= James Eyre (judge) =

English judge (1734–1799)

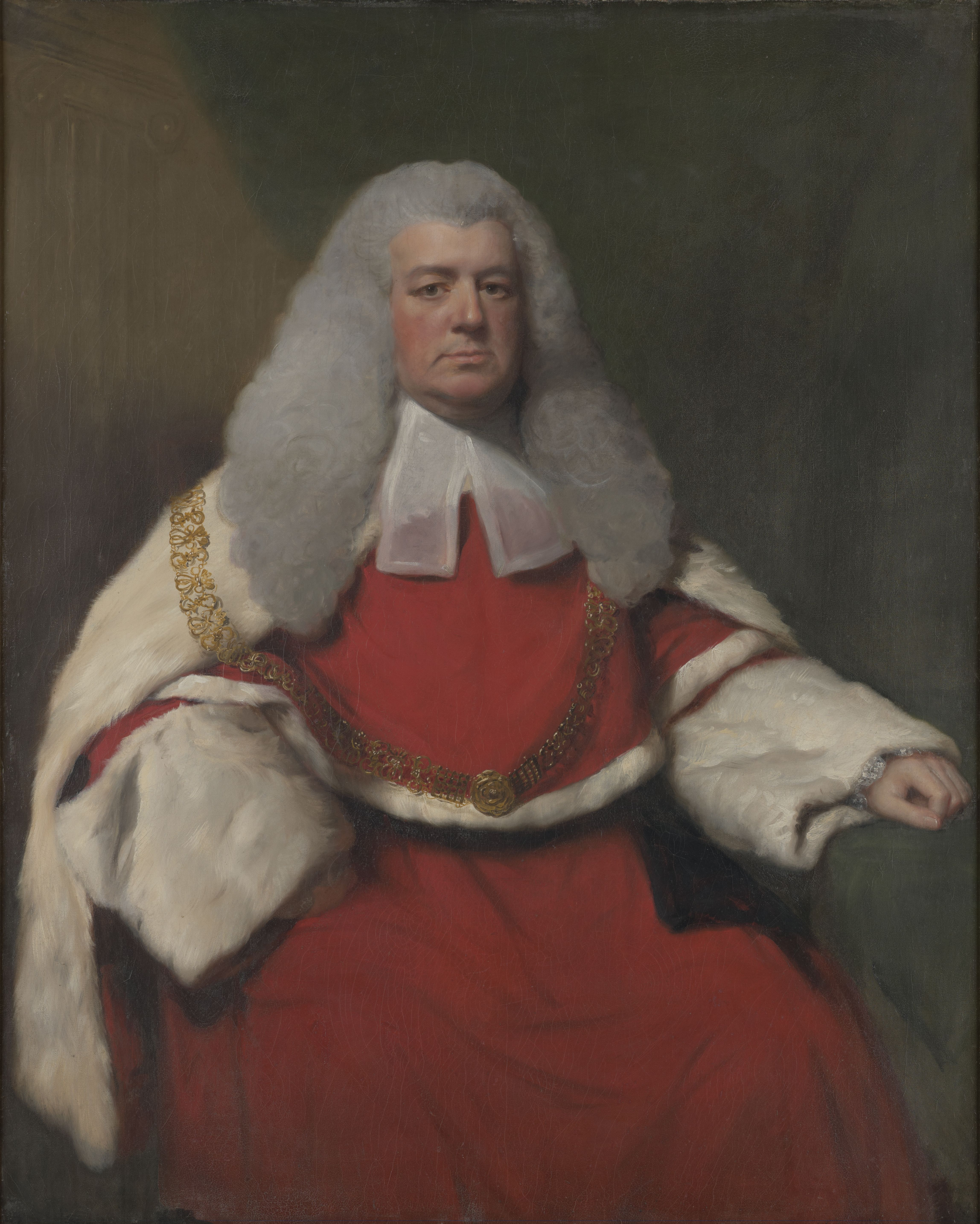
Sir James Eyre, 1770 portrait by Lemuel Francis Abbott.

Sir James Eyre PC (1734 – 1 July 1799) was an English judge, the son of the Rev. Thomas Eyre, of Wells, Somerset.

== Biography ==
He was educated at Winchester College and at St John's College, Oxford, which he left without taking a degree. He was called to the bar at Gray's Inn in 1755, through the influence of Thomas Parker, chief baron of the exchequer. He commenced practice in the lord mayors and sheriffs courts, paying £63 (2011: £8,000) for one of the four counsel to the City of London Corporation.

He was appointed Recorder of London in 1763 and knighted in 1770.

He was counsel for the plaintiff in the case of Wilkes v. Wood, and made a brilliant speech in condemnation of the execution of general search warrants. His refusal to voice the remonstrances of the corporation against the exclusion of Wilkes from Parliament earned him the recognition of the ministry, and he was appointed a Baron of the Exchequer in 1772 and Chief Baron of the Exchequer in 1787. From June 1792 to January 1793 he was Chief Commissioner of the Great Seal. In 1793 he was made Chief Justice of the Common Pleas, and presided over the trials of Horne Tooke, Robert Thomas Crossfield and others.

In 1793 statutory powers were sought by Bishop Yorke to sell Wisbech Castle and grounds. The Bill passed despite the opposition of Eyre and the premises were sold by auction in the same year to Joseph Medworth. Eyre was son-in-law of Henry Southwell of Bank House, Wisbech, Isle of Ely a member of the family tenanting the castle, and to that extent an interested party.

He was elected a Fellow of the Royal Society in May 1791.

He died in 1799 and was buried at Ruscombe in Berkshire.

Legal offices
Preceded by Alexander Wedderburn	Chief Justice of the Common Pleas; 1793–1799	Succeeded by John Scott
Preceded by Sir John Skynner	Chief Baron of the Exchequer; 1787–1793	Succeeded by Sir Archibald Macdonald
