= Nicholas de Drayton =

English ecclesiastic and judge

Nicholas de Drayton (fl. 1376), was an English ecclesiastic and judge.

Drayton was appointed warden of King's College, Cambridge, on 1 December 1363, with a salary of fourpence a day, and an allowance of eight marcs per annum for robes. In 1369 he was suspected of heresy, and the Bishop of London was authorised to commit him to prison (20 March). In 1376 he was appointed a baron of the exchequer. The date of his death is uncertain. He is commonly described as 'magister.'
