= Gorges Edmond Howard =

Irish lawyer and legal writer, Freeman of Dublin

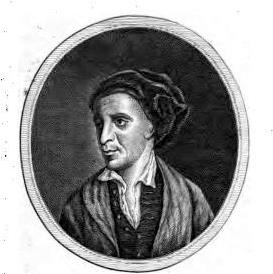
Gorges Edmond Howard.

Gorges Edmond Howard (1715–1786) was a miscellaneous Irish writer. He wrote on the law and created literary works.

== Biography ==
Gorges Edmond Howard was the son of Captain Francis Howard (of dragoons) and Elizabeth (born Jackson). He was born in Coleraine on 28 August 1715 and educated at Thomas Sheridan's school in Dublin.

Howard became an apprentice in the exchequer at Dublin and after a dalliance with becoming a soldier, he perserevered and became a solicitor. He secured a lucrative business as a solicitor and land agent, and published professional works at his own expense. He failed to achieve notability as a writer and he was satirised by Robert Jephson for his unsolicited productivity. Jephson invented a mock correspondence between George Faulkner and Howard, allegedly encouraged by Lord Townshend.

Howard was active in suggesting improvements in Dublin, having some skill as an architect. The freedom of the city was conferred on him in 1766. He died in Dublin in June 1786.

His daughter Anne married her second cousin, Hamilton Gorges, and started a branch of the Gorges family that continued to use "Howard" as their middle name.

== Selected works ==
1. A Collection of Apothegms and Maxims for the Good Conduct of Life, .. 1767
2. Almeyda, or the Rival Kings, 1769
3. The Siege of Tamor, 1773
4. The Female Gamester, 1778
5. Miscellaneous Works in Verse and Prose, 1782

Also numerous works on the law.
