= Richard Perryn =

Welsh judge

Sir Richard Perryn (1723–1803) was a Welsh judge who became baron of the exchequer.

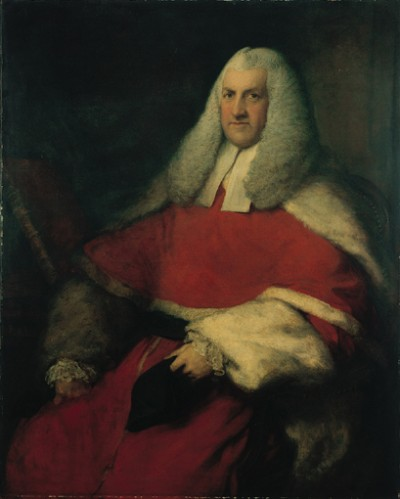
Richard Perryn, 1779 portrait by Thomas Gainsborough.

== Life ==
The son of Benjamin Perryn of Flint, merchant, by his wife, Jane, eldest daughter of Richard Adams, town clerk of Chester, he was baptised in the parish church of Flint on 16 August 1723. He was educated at Ruthin Grammar School and The Queen's College, Oxford, where he matriculated on 13 March 1741, but did not take any degree. He was admitted a student of Lincoln's Inn on 6 November 1740, and on 27 April 1746 migrated to the Inner Temple, where he was called to the bar on 3 July 1747.

Perryn began practice in the court of chancery, and gradually acquired such a reputation there as to be employed during the latter years of his practice in almost every cause. On 20 July 1770 he became vice-chamberlain of Chester, and in the same year was made a King's Counsel and a bencher of the Inner Temple. On 6 April 1776 he kissed hands on his appointment as a Baron of the Exchequer in the place of Sir John Burland, and was knighted on the same day. He was called to the degree of serjeant-at-law and sworn into office on the 26th of the same month.

Perryn retired from the bench in the long vacation of 1799, and died at his house at Twickenham on 2 January 1803, aged 79. He was buried on the 10th of the same month in ‘the new burial-ground’ at Twickenham, and a tablet was erected to his memory in the south chancel wall of the old parish church.

Some remarks on Perryn's charge to the grand jury of Sussex at the Lent assizes in 1785 are appended to Thoughts on Executive Justice with respect to our Criminal Laws, particularly on the Circuits, London, 1785.

Perryn presided over the trial of the Birmingham Rioters at the Warwick Assizes on Tuesday the 23d of August, 1791, and the following day.

== Family ==
Perryn married Mary, eldest daughter of Henry Browne of Skelbrooke in the West Riding of Yorkshire, by whom he had several children. His wife died on 19 April 1795, aged 73.
