= John Sotherton =

English judge

John Sotherton the younger (1562–1631) was an English judge, member of a prominent parliamentary, judicial and mercantile family of London and East Anglia, who became Cursitor Baron of the Exchequer in 1610.

== Life ==
He was the son of John Sotherton, who was from 16 June 1579 until his death, on 26 October 1605, Baron of the Court of Exchequer, by his second wife, Maria, daughter of Edward Woton, M.D., who was buried by the side of her husband in the church of St. Botolph, Aldersgate Street, London. The Sotherton family originally came from the village of Sotherton in Suffolk, and many members of it were mercers in London or Norwich. George Sotherton, master of Merchant Taylors' Company in 1589, was M.P. for London 1593–8, and Nowell Sotherton (d. 1610), John's uncle, was Cursitor Baron of the Exchequer from July 1606. Nicholas Sotherton, Sheriff of Norwich in 1572, was author of a history of Robert Kett's Rebellion, The Commoyson in Norfolk, 1549.

John matriculated from Christ Church, Oxford, on 20 November 1580, graduated B.A. on 22 Jan 1582–3, being in the same year incorporated at Cambridge, and proceeded M.A. April 1586. He was admitted in November 1587 a member of the Inner Temple, where he was called to the bar in 1597, and elected a bencher in 1610. During this period he married twice, first to Anne (a daughter and heir of the Bray family), and secondly to Elizabeth, daughter of Richard Cook, by one of whom he had sons John and Valentine, armigerous heirs, who both followed him in studying at Christ Church, Oxford, and several daughters, including Anne who married Sir John Throckmorton.

In 1600 Sotherton purchased the manor of Wadenhall, in the parish of Waltham, Kent, from the crown, which became the inheritance of his son John. Valentine became a clergyman, and held the living of Spelsbury, Oxfordshire, 1636–41.

He was appointed Receiver-General for the counties of Bedfordshire and Buckinghamshire in July 1604, and was advanced to the post of Cursitor Baron of the Exchequer on 29 October 1610. In that year he assisted in deliberating the special verdict against John Mackalley for the murder of a Serjeant to the Sheriffs. He sat regularly as one of the Commissioners of Gaol Delivery for the City of London, was joined with Sir Julius Caesar, Sir Francis Bacon and others in a Commission of Ways and Means in August 1612, and at a later date was one of the Assessors of Compositions for Defective Titles, and an Inspector of Nuisances for Middlesex.

In later life, in 1622, Sotherton took as his last wife Elizabeth Rich (daughter of Richard Rich (d.1598) and Jane Machell, and sister of Sir Nathaniel Rich and Dame Margaret Wroth), who was then widow of Sir John Morgan of Chilworth, Surrey, who died in 1621. Sotherton died in 1631, his successor on the bench, James Pagitt, being appointed on 24 October of that year. Dame Elizabeth survived him, but remembered her stepson among her bequests.
