= Richard Banke =

English judge

Richard Banke or Bankes (fl. 1410), was an English judge.

Banke was appointed a baron of the exchequer by the continual council in 1410, during the virtual interregnum caused by the mental and physical decay of Henry IV, and re-appointed by Henry V in 1414. He was paid as such until March 1416. He married Margaret, daughter of William de Rivere. The date of his death is altogether uncertain, there being nothing to indicate who succeeded him on the bench. He was interred in the priory of St. Bartholomew, London, on the site of which St. Bartholomew's Hospital now stands, as was also his wife. Stow, to whom we are indebted for the record of this fact, spells his name Vancke and his wife's maiden name Rivar.
