= Writ of quominus =

English legal fiction (c. 1230 – 1883)

In the history of the courts of England and Wales, the writ of quominus, or writ of quo minus (Latin: "that not"), was a writ and legal fiction which allowed the Court of Exchequer to obtain a jurisdiction over cases normally brought in the Court of Common Pleas. The Exchequer was tasked with collecting the King's revenue, and the legal fiction worked by having the plaintiff in a debt case claim that he was a debtor to the king, and that the defendant's debt prevented him paying the King. As such, the defendant would be arrested, and the case heard by the Exchequer. The writ's predecessors were in use from at least 1230, and it was in common (albeit strict) use during the 16th century. The use continued into the 19th century, until all original writs were abolished in 1883.

== Writ ==
The Court of Exchequer's main task was collecting royal revenues and taxes, partially through ensuring that debts to the Crown were paid. It soon developed the ability to hear "common" cases, usually heard by the Court of Common Pleas, and did so through the writ of quominus. The origins of the writ are unknown, although some academics link it to a process through which a claimant could bring a claim jointly with the King or in part payment towards his debt to the King, in cases where the King had an interest. The earliest record of a similar writ is 1230, although not with the quo minus wording. The use was similar to that of the Bill of Middlesex, a similar legal fiction used by the Court of King's Bench; where a plaintiff claims money from a defendant for payment of a debt, the plaintiff would claim to be a debtor to the King, unable to pay his money to the King because of the defendant's debt.

If this legal fiction was successful, the defendant would be arrested and brought before the Court of Exchequer, where the case would be heard. By the 16th century, the writ was commonly used in the Court of Exchequer, although fairly strictly; when taking a case the court would investigate whether there was any benefit to the King in hearing it, and if not would refer the case to another court. There was little interruption by the Court of Common Pleas, mainly due to their ongoing struggle with the Court of King's Bench over the Bill of Middlesex, which occupied most of their time. Wurzel suggests that the introduction and widespread use of this writ was not due to any arrogance on the part of the Exchequer, but rather because they felt that as "the most ancient" court they should have superior jurisdiction. The writ continued into the 19th century, although it was abolished with the rest of the original writs through the Civil Procedure Rules of the Supreme Court of Judicature in 1883.
