= Augustine Bernher =

English priest

Augustine Bernher (fl. 1554) was a priest in England.

== Life ==
Bernher, a clerk and servant of Hugh Latimer, Bishop of Worcester, was a Swiss, or, according to Fox, a Belgian. During the reign of Mary he was minister of a congregation in London, and is said to have lived much at Baxterley. When Latimer was committed to the Tower on 13 September 1553, Bernher attended him there, and the next year waited on him and the other bishops imprisoned at Oxford. In this year also he succoured John Jewel when in great need during his flight from Oxford, and so saved his life. Throughout the Marian persecutions he was a constant friend to Catholic martyrs, and a kind of overseer to the wives and fatherless children of those who died for their religion. In a letter written shortly before his death, Robert Glover bade his wife be guided by Bernher, whom he called "an angel of God"; and John Bradford, writing from his prison, addressed him as "my own good Augustine". He comforted and attended on Glover, Careless, Joyce Lewis, and Cuthbert Sympson, who suffered martyrdom in 1555–8.

In the reign of Elizabeth he was rector of Sutton (Memorials, i. 589), or, according to Tanner, of Southam, and was noted for the indignation he expressed against the priests who conformed to the ecclesiastical changes then enforced. He wrote Testimonies taken out of God's Word, &c., An Answer to Certain Scriptures, &c., manuscripts in the Bodleian Library, Epistola ad dominum suum (Ridley), a manuscript in Emmanuel College, Cambridge, and edited Latimer's Sermons with a Latin preface addressed to Catherine, Duchess of Suffolk, (published 1572, another edition 1635), and Latimer's Works (Parker Soc.), i. 311. Notices of Bernher are in works published by the Parker Society, e.g. Bradford's Works, i. 306, ii. 168, 186, and Ridley's Works, 381.

== Sources ==
This article incorporates text from a publication now in the public domain: This article incorporates text from a publication now in the public domain: "Bernher, Augustine". Dictionary of National Biography. London: Smith, Elder & Co. 1885–1900.
