= Joan Washingby =

Coventry martyr

Joan Washingby or Washingburn (née Ward, d. 1512) was a Lollard and one of the Coventry Martyrs.

Joan was taught Lollard ideas in Coventry by Alice Rowley in about 1490 but left the town out of fear of Alice’s husband, who opposed the movement. She lived in Northampton and London with the support of the Lollard network. In London, she married a shoemaker, Thomas Washingby, who had already been investigated for Lollardry in the 1480s.

In August 1495, Joan and Thomas Washingby were arrested in Maidstone for expressing heretical opinions. They recanted their opinions and were branded with an h on their jaws and released.

Returning to Coventry alone, Joan resumed her sharing of Wycliffite doctrines and books. In 1511 and 1512, she was brought before the bishop several times until, in 1512, she was executed by burning, with Alice Rowley carrying the firewood in procession with her.

Joan Ward Street in Coventry is named after her.
