= Joyce Lewis =

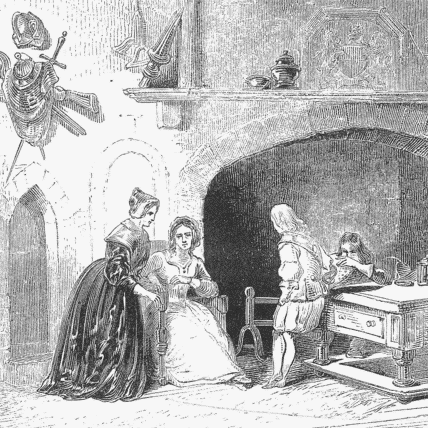
Joyce Lewes in Foxe's Book of Martyrs. "Mistress Joyce Lewes, a gentlewoman born, was delicately brought up in the pleasures of the world ..." The illustration is meant to show how the messenger of her accusation was forced to eat his message.

Joyce Lewis or Jocasta Lewis (died 1557) was an English Protestant martyr.

== Life ==
She was only daughter of Thomas and Anne Curzon of Croxall Hall in Staffordshire. Her maternal grandfather was Sir John Aston of Tixall. She first married Sir George Appleby of Appleby in Leicestershire and they had two sons. Her husband died in 1547 at the Battle of Pinkie.

She then married Thomas Lewis of Mancetter on 10 September 1547. She was a Catholic, but she began to question her faith, according to the partisan martyrologist John Foxe, after the martyrdom of Lawrence Saunders on 8 February 1555. Her move to being a Protestant was led by the brother of another martyr, Robert Glover, who died the same year.

Her previous devotion to Catholicism was replaced by "irreverent behaviour in church" which came to the notice of Ralph Baines, the Bishop of Lichfield. Lewis spent a year in jail before she was taken, with the comfort of the priest Augustine Bernher, to be burnt at Lichfield on 18 December 1557.

== Legacy ==
Lewis was said to have been aware of the impact of her own death and she had consulted to maximise the value of her sacrifice. After she died, eleven of her supporters were summoned to account for their actions. Under pressure they all recanted. A memorial to Joyce Lewis and Robert Glover was placed in Mancetter Church in 1833.
