= Cornelius Bongey =

Cornelius Bongey (or Bungey) (died 19 September 1555) was an English Protestant martyr who was burnt at Coventry in September 1555.

Little is known of his life, except that he was a capper (or hatmaker), and that he was accused, and did not deny, that he “did hold, maintain, argue and teach” a range of Protestant beliefs, suggesting he was a lay preacher. He was tried before the Bishop of Lichfield and Coventry and sentenced to death.

Bongey was burnt to death at Coventry for heresy on 20 September 1555, together with Robert Glover. They, and ten other such martyrs from the reigns of Henry VIII and Mary I, are commemorated on a memorial in the city, and are known collectively as the Coventry Martyrs.
