= Coventry Martyrs =

Executed 16th-century English religious protesters

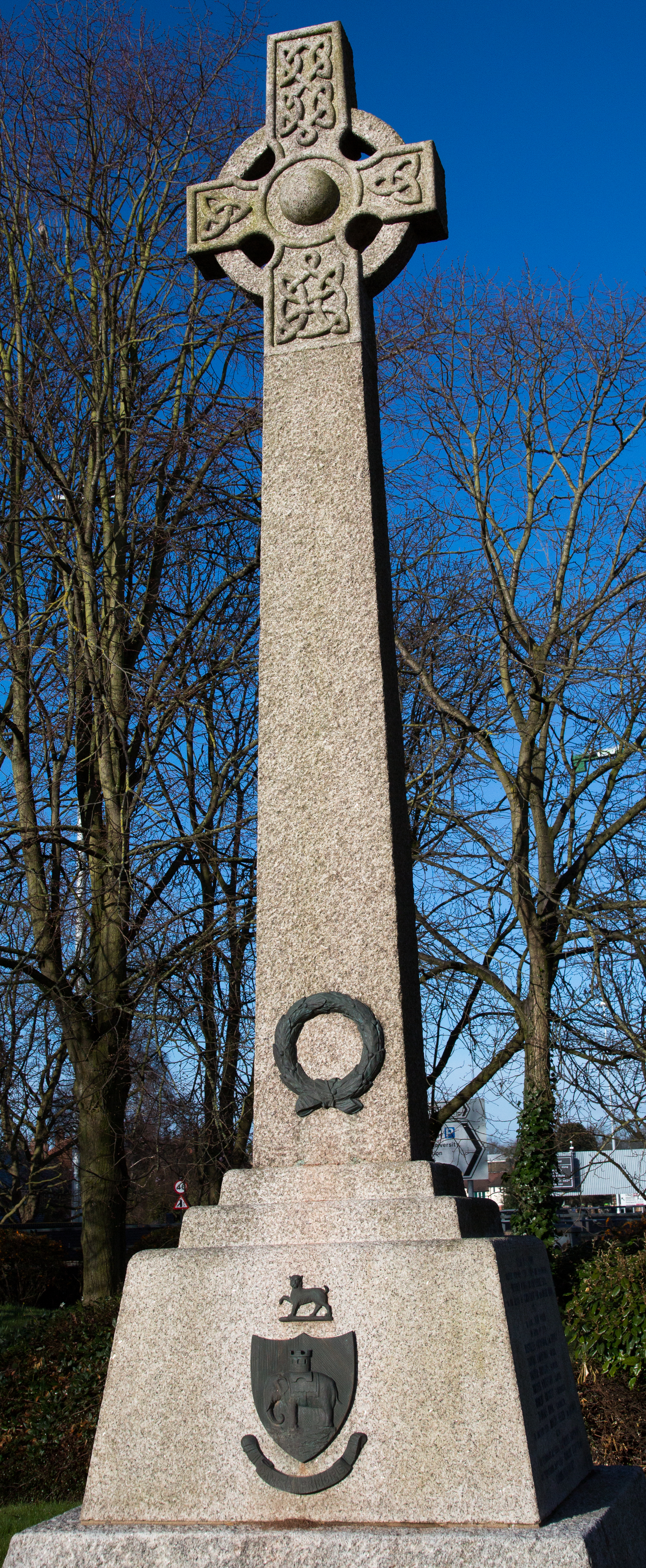
The Coventry Martyrs' monument.

The Coventry Martyrs were a disparate group of Lollard Christians executed for their beliefs in Coventry between 1512 and 1522 (seven men and two women) and in 1555 (three men). Eleven of them are commemorated by a six-metre-high (20-foot) monument, erected in 1910 in a public garden in the city, between Little Park Street and Mile Lane; and by a mosaic constructed in 1953 inside the entrance to Broadgate House in the city centre. Some of the streets in the city's Cheylesmore suburb are named after them.

== Lollardy in 15th-century Coventry ==
Former Coventry vicar and historian Alan Munden has made the case for the number of martyrs to be increased to thirteen, if a woman burned in 1432 for Lollardy is included among their number. Lollards were known to be active in the city as early as 1414, and sources of the time record Lollardy-related public order incidents in 1424 and 1431. In 1432, the wife of a mayor was executed at Coventry for Lollardy, with further ecclesiastical court trials recorded for 1445 and 1486.

== Lollardy in 16th-century Coventry – the first martyrs ==
In 1511–12, some 74 Lollards appeared before the court of Geoffrey Blythe, the bishop of Coventry and Lichfield, most of them from Coventry and the surrounding area. It is likely they were interrogated either at the bishop's manor at Maxstoke, or at the Greyfriars monastery in the city itself. Those who confessed were forced to sign an abjuration, to be read by the accused bare-legged and bare-headed in the Cathedral. However, the bishop's campaign appears to have been unsuccessful, and the following year nine people were burned in the city, most of them individuals who had abjured and done penance the previous year, but had since returned to their sincerely held Lollard views. Records suggest that the possession of Protestant literature, and of the Scriptures in English (illegal at the time), were a significant part of the case against them.

Those martyred were as follows:

Joan Washingby (born Ward), who had been a Lollard in various towns, for 20 years, but had also previously abjured (about 1495) in Maidstone. She was burnt at Coventry on 12 March 1512, though there is some dispute about the date. The monument has 1510 (it was erected to mark the 400th anniversary of her death), the mosaic has 1511, and Mozley has 1512.

Master Archer (a shoemaker), Thomas Bond (a shoemaker), Master Hawkins (a shoemaker or skinner), Robert Hockett, or Hatchet, or Hatchets (a shoemaker or leather-dresser), Thomas Lansdail or Lansdale (a hosier) and Master Wrigsham (a glover) were all burned on 4 April 1520. The monument gives a date of 1519 for these deaths.

A widow, Mistress Smith, was due to be discharged when a document was discovered in her sleeve, containing (in English) the Lord's Prayer, Ten Commandments and Apostles' Creed. For this, she was immediately condemned and burnt with the others. The memorial names her 'Mistress Lansdail (or Smith)'.

Robert Silkeby (or Silkby or Silkesby) was burnt on 13 January 1522, having previously escaped after being apprehended with those burned in 1520. He appears to have acted as librarian to the group, keeping tracts, English scripture portions, commentaries and mystical writings on their behalf.

== Persecution under Mary Tudor ==
The three martyrs burnt during the reign of Mary Tudor were executed not for Lollardy (many of Lollardy's values having by then found expression in the ideas of the Reformation), but for continuing to hold Protestant views after the Catholic faith was restored under Mary.

Laurence Saunders was burnt in the city on 8 February 1555. Educated at Cambridge University, he was ordained during the time of Henry VIII, and by 1553 was a 'prominent London cleric'. When Mary succeeded to the throne, he was imprisoned for 15 months, for belief in two (instead of seven) sacraments, and for refusal to hold to the doctrines of transubstantiation, the necessity of confession to a priest, and the universal authority of the Pope. Foxe's Book of Martyrs records that, at the stake, he said 'Welcome the cross of Christ, welcome everlasting life'.

Robert Glover was also educated at Cambridge University, and was a fellow of King's College. He was tried at Lichfield, and burnt in Coventry on 20 September 1555.

Cornelius Bongey, or Bungey, was a tradesman (hatmaker), and was executed on the same day as Glover.

== Commemorating the martyrs ==
The site of the executions in the manorial park at Cheylesmore, just south of the city wall at the time, was known into the nineteenth century. But it was not until the early part of the twentieth century that public pressure for a monument led to a mayoral committee being formed in 1908, and the erection of the monument in 1910. Carved in Cornish granite, it was funded from an appeal that raised £200, a significant sum of money at the time.

Just before the Second World War, a number of streets in the area were named after the martyrs (all except Archer, Bond and Hawkins). In addition, two streets were named after the movement and bore witness to their fate – Lollard Croft and Martyrs Close. In addition, John Grace Street bears the name of one of the 15th-century Lollard preachers tried in the city, and released after doing penance.

In 1953, the mosaic was designed by Hugh Hosking, and created by Geneva artist Rene Antoinette. A street in the city's Radford suburb was named after Laurence Saunders at this time, and a Baptist church bearing his name was founded and opened there in 1990.

== See also ==
- List of Protestant martyrs of the English Reformation
