= Robert Glover (martyr) =

English Protestant martyr

Robert Glover (died 1555) was an English Protestant martyr who was burnt at Coventry in September 1555.

Glover was born at Mancetter, Warwickshire, and educated at Eton College and King's College, Cambridge. Under Henry VIII he became attracted to Protestant views. He gained in BA in 1538, MA in 1541, and was a fellow until 1543. He married a niece of Hugh Latimer.

He was burnt to death at Coventry for heresy on 20 September 1555. He had been arrested earlier that year.

Glover is among twelve such martyrs from the reigns of Henry VIII and Mary I commemorated on a memorial in the city, who are known collectively as the Coventry Martyrs.
