= Court of Common Pleas (England) =

English court for disputes between commoners (c. 1200 – 1880)

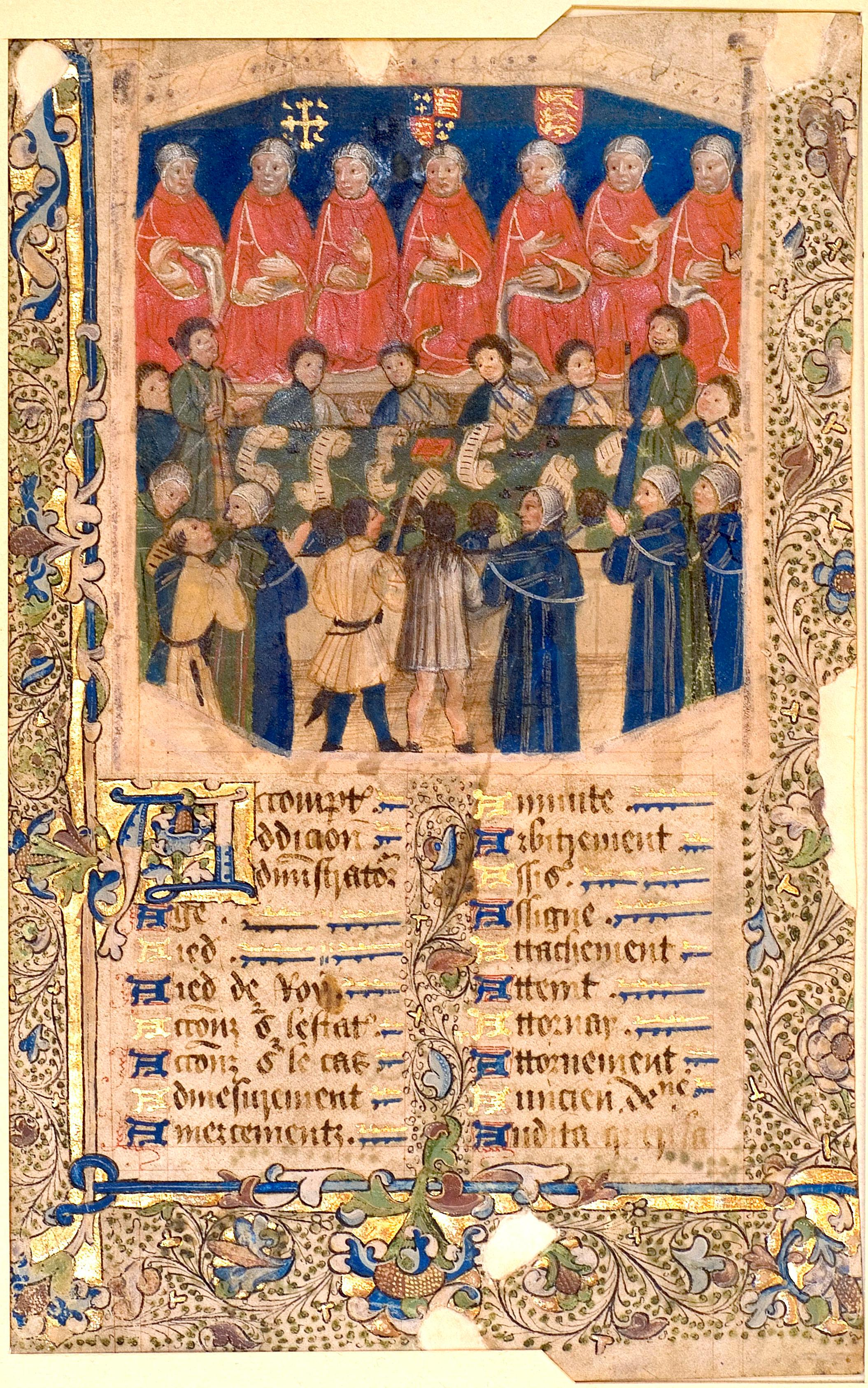
A 15th-century manuscript showing the Court of Common Pleas at work. The image shows pleaders and clients standing in front of seven Justices, and below them, their clerks

The Court of Common Pleas, or Common Bench, was a common law court in the English legal system that covered "common pleas"; actions between subject and subject, which did not concern the king. Created in the late 12th to early 13th century after splitting from the Exchequer of Pleas, the Common Pleas served as one of the central English courts for around 600 years. Authorised by Magna Carta to sit in a fixed location, the Common Pleas sat in Westminster Hall joined by the Exchequer of Pleas and Court of King's Bench.

The court's jurisdiction was gradually undercut by the King's Bench and Exchequer of Pleas with legal fictions, the Bill of Middlesex and Writ of Quominus respectively. The Common Pleas maintained its exclusive jurisdiction over matters of real property until its dissolution, and due to its wide remit was considered by Sir Edward Coke to be the "lock and key of the common law". It was staffed by one Chief Justice and a varying number of puisne justices, who were required to be Serjeants-at-Law, and until the mid 19th century only Serjeants were allowed to plead there.

As one of the two principal common law courts with the King's Bench, the Common Pleas fought to maintain its jurisdiction and caseload, in a way that during the 16th and 17th centuries was categorised as conservative and reactionary. Reaching an acceptable medium with the King's Bench and Exchequer of Pleas proved to be the downfall of all three courts; with several courts of near-identical jurisdiction, there was little need for separate bodies, and the superior courts of Westminster were merged by the Supreme Court of Judicature Act 1873 (36 & 37 Vict. c. 66) into a single High Court of Justice. With an Order in Council issued on 16 December 1880, the Common Pleas Division of the High Court ceased to exist, marking the end of the Court of Common Pleas.

== History ==
=== Origin ===
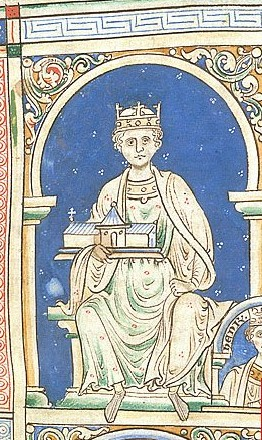
Henry II of England, who was originally thought to have created the Court of Common Pleas through a royal decree in 1178

Originally, the sole fixed court like body was the curia regis, one of the three central administrative bodies along with the Exchequer and Chancery, from which the Court of Chancery formed. This curia was the king's court, composed of those advisers and courtiers who followed the king as he travelled around the country. This was not a dedicated court of law, instead a descendant of the witenagemot. In concert with the curia regis, eyre circuits staffed by itinerant judges dispensed justice throughout the country, operating on fixed paths at certain times. These judges were also members of the curia, and would hear cases on the king's behalf in the "lesser curia regis". Gradually, the curia split into two distinct branches, the coram rege (King's Bench) and de banco (Common Bench, or Common Pleas). Much academic discussion occurs over the circumstances and times of their founding. In 1178, a chronicler recorded that when Henry II:

learned that the land and the men of the land were burdened by so great a number of justices, for there were, eighteen, chose with the counsel of the wise men of his kingdom five only, two clerks three and laymen, all of his private family, and decreed that these five should hear all complaints of the kingdom and should do right and should not depart from the king's court but should remain there to hear the complaints of men, with this understanding that, if there should come up among them any question which could not be brought to a conclusion by them, it should be presented to a royal hearing and be determined by the king and the wiser men of the kingdom.

This was originally interpreted as the foundation of the King's Bench, with the Court of Common Pleas not coming into existence until the granting of Magna Carta, which mandated in Section 17 that common pleas (cases between subject and subject, as opposed to cases involving the king) be heard in "some fixed place". This ensured that rather than the source of justice moving from place to place as the king did, there would be a fixed location that claimants and defendants could travel to that would address their problems. The later theory was that Henry II's decree created the Court of Common Pleas, not the King's Bench, and that the King's Bench instead split from the Common Pleas at some later time. In the 20th century, with better access to historical documents, legal historians have come to a different conclusion. Rather than the Common Pleas being created out of the curia regis directly, it instead arose out of the Exchequer of Pleas, another body split from the curia regis. By the beginning of the 13th century, a split began; chronicles from 1201 identify the "bench" and "exchequer" as distinct bodies, and records of Barons of the Exchequer and Justices of the Common Pleas show a distinct lack of overlap.

The Court of Common Pleas, along with the other superior courts, sat in Westminster Hall from its creation. Due to the provisions in Magna Carta, it was bound to sit there, although Richard II did move the court temporarily to York in a dispute with the City of London. An apocryphal seventeenth century story says that Orlando Bridgeman refused to move the court a few feet to avoid the draught from the north entrance, fearing that to do so would be to infringe on Magna Carta. The court sat in a space marked off by a wooden bar (which counsel stood behind) with the court officials sitting at a large oak table covered in green cloth and the justices on a raised platform (or "bench") at the rear of the court.

=== Struggle with the King's Bench ===
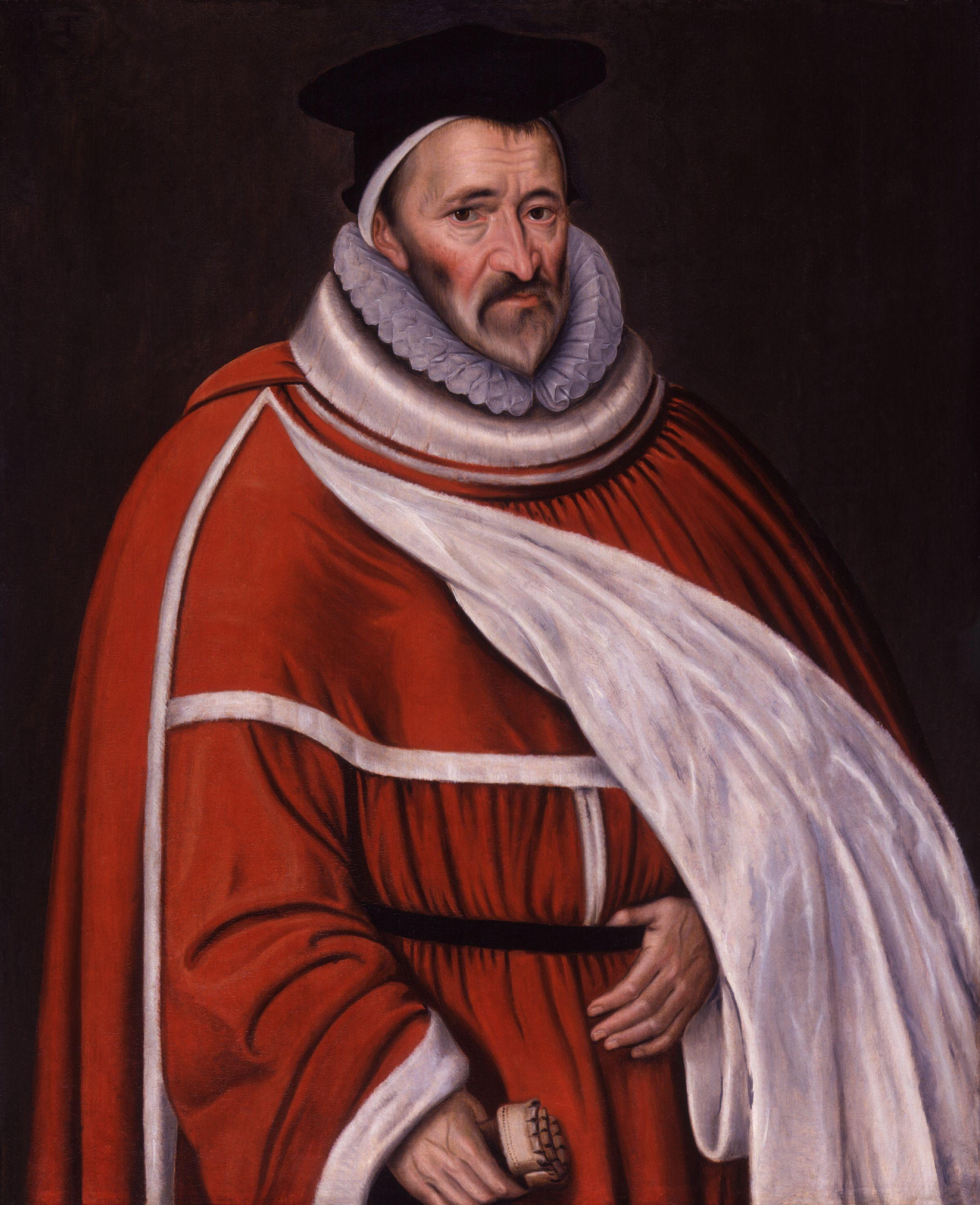
Sir Edmund Anderson, the conservative Chief Justice of the Common Pleas who brought the Common Pleas and King's Bench into conflict over assumpsit.

During the 15th century, the common law courts were challenged by the civil law and equity found in the Chancery and similar courts. These courts and legal methods were much faster than the common law courts, so lawyers and claimants flocked to them. This was perceived as a threat to the common law courts, for good reason; between 1460 and 1540, the business of the common law courts significantly dropped, while the Chancery's cases rose massively in number. In reaction to this, the Court of King's Bench developed its own, faster system, intent on winning cases back, and through procedures such as the Writ of Quominus and Bill of Middlesex acquired a wider jurisdiction. While this succeeded in forming an equilibrium between the old common law courts and the new courts, it was viewed with suspicion by the Common Pleas, who became highly reactionary to the changes the King's Bench attempted to introduce. When the King's Bench attempted to use the Bill of Middlesex to widen its jurisdiction, the Common Pleas became increasingly conservative in its attempts to avoid ceding cases. This was limited by the fact that the three Common Pleas prothonotaries could not agree on how to cut costs, leaving the court both expensive and of limited malleability while the King's Bench became faster, cheaper and more varied in its jurisdiction.

The troubles during this period are best illustrated by Slade's Case. Under the medieval common law, claims seeking the repayment of a debt or other matters could only be pursued through a writ of debt in the Common Pleas, a problematic and archaic process. By 1558 the lawyers had succeeded in creating another method, enforced by the Court of King's Bench, through the action of assumpsit, which was technically for deceit. The legal fiction used was that by failing to pay after promising to do so, a defendant had committed deceit, and was liable to the plaintiff. The conservative Common Pleas, through the appellate court the Court of Exchequer Chamber, began to overrule decisions made by the King's Bench on assumpsit, causing friction between the courts. In Slade's Case, the Chief Justice of the King's Bench, John Popham, deliberately provoked the Common Pleas into bringing an assumpsit action to a higher court where the Justices of the King's Bench could vote, allowing them to overrule the Common Pleas and establish assumpsit as the main contractual action. After the death of Edmund Anderson, the more activist Francis Gawdy became Chief Justice of the Common Pleas, which briefly led to a less reactionary and more revolutionary court.

Vexatious Arrests and Delays at Law Act 1661
- Act of Parliament
- Parliament of England
- Long title: An Act for prevention of Vexations and Oppressions by Arrests and of Delaies in Suits of Law.
- Citation: 13 Cha. 2. St. 2. c. 2
- Territorial extent: England and Wales

Dates
- Royal assent: 20 December 1661
- Commencement: 20 November 1661 (Note: Start of session.)
- Repealed: 15 August 1879
Other legislation
Amended by	Statute Law Revision Act 1863
Repealed by	Civil Procedure Acts Repeal Act 1879
Relates to	Sheriffs and Bailiffs, Fees, etc. Act 1444; Costs Act 1531; Execution Act 1605; Easter Offerings and Tithes Act 1548

Status: Repealed

Text of statute as originally enacted

The Interregnum granted some respite to the Common Pleas, which abolished fines on original writs, hurting the King's Bench, but in 1660 the fines were reinstated and "then the very attorneys of the Common Pleas boggled at them and carried all their finable business to the King's Bench". In 1661 the Common Pleas attempted to reverse this by pushing for an act of Parliament, the Vexatious Arrests and Delays at Law Act 1661 (13 Cha. 2. St. 2. c. 2) to abolish latitats based on legal fictions, forbidding "special bail" in any case where "the true cause of action" was not expressed in the process. The King's Bench got around this in the 1670s; the act did not say that the process had to be true, so the court continued to use legal fictions, simply ensuring that the true cause of action was expressed in the process, regardless of whether or not it was correct. The Bill of Middlesex disclosed the true cause of action, satisfying the 1661 statute, but did not require a valid complaint. This caused severe friction within the court system, and Francis North, Chief Justice of the Common Pleas, eventually reached a compromise by allowing such legal fictions in the Common Pleas as well as the King's Bench.

=== Unity and dissolution ===
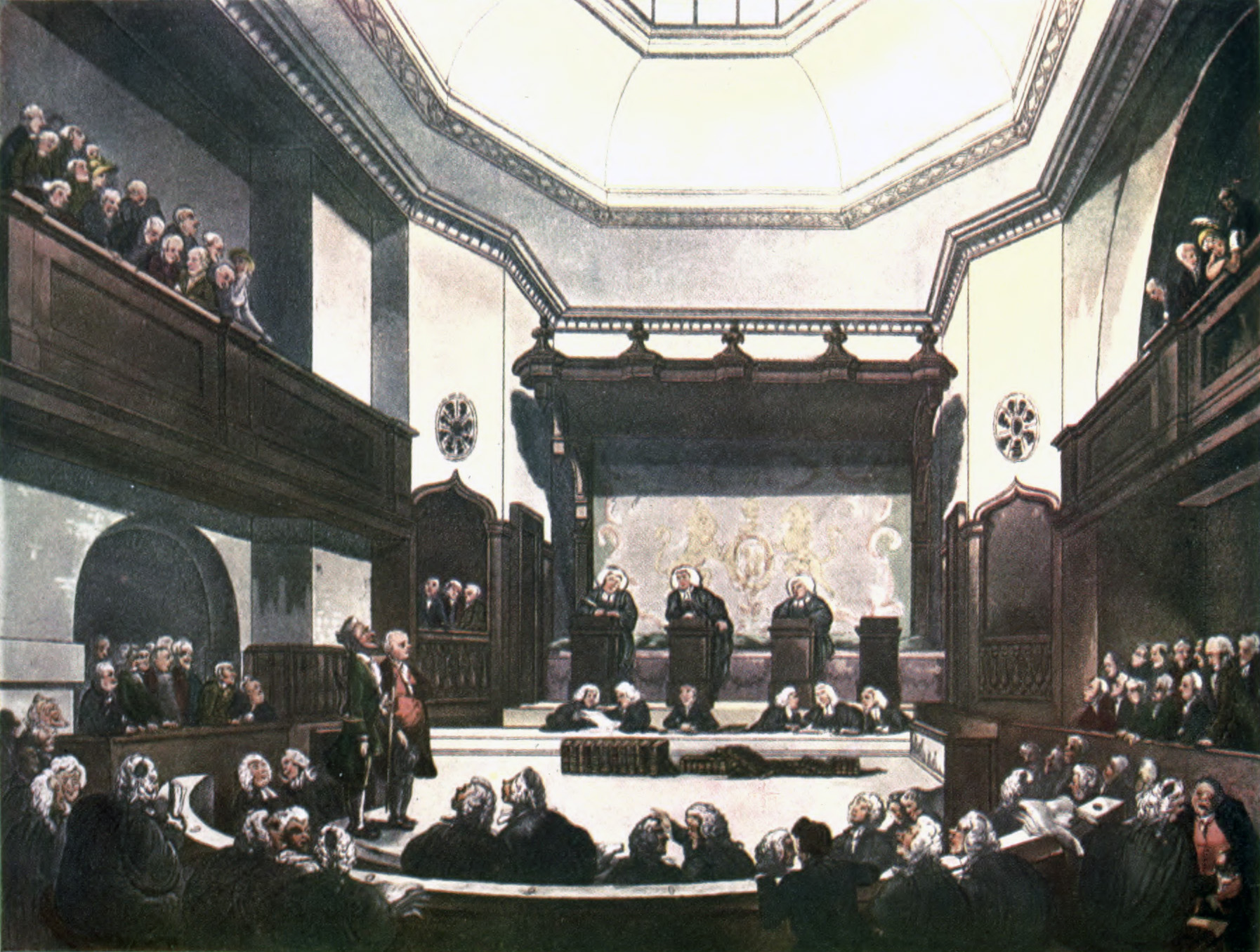
The Court of Common Pleas in 1808

The unintended outcome of these compromises was that by the end of Charles II's reign, all three common law courts had a similar jurisdiction over most common pleas, with similar processes. By the 18th century, it was customary to speak of the "twelve justices" of the three courts, not distinguishing them, and assize cases were shared equally between them. In 1828, Henry Brougham complained that:

The jurisdiction of the Court of King's Bench, for example, was originally confined to pleas of the Crown, and then extended to actions where violence was used - actions of trespass, by force; but now, all actions are admissible within its walls, through the medium of a legal fiction, which was adopted for the purpose of enlarging its authority, that every person sued is in the custody of the marshal of the court and may, therefore, be proceeded against for any personal cause of actions. Thus, by degrees, this court has drawn over to itself actions which really belong to...the Court of Common Pleas. The Court of Common Pleas, however...never was able to obtain cognizance of - the peculiar subject of King's Bench jurisdiction - Crown Pleas... the Exchequer has adopted a similar course for, though it was originally confined to the trial of revenue cases, it has, by means of another fiction - the supposition that everybody sued is a debtor to the Crown, and further, that he cannot pay his debt, because the other party will not pay him, - opened its doors to every suitor, and so drawn to itself the right of trying cases, that were never intended to be placed within its jurisdiction.

The purpose of Brougham's speech was to illustrate that three courts of identical jurisdiction were unnecessary, and further that it would create a situation where the best judges, lawyers and cases would eventually go to one court, overburdening that body and leaving the others near-useless. In 1823, 43,465 actions were brought in the King's Bench, 13,009 in the Common Pleas and 6,778 in the Exchequer of Pleas. Not surprisingly, the King's Bench judges were "immoderately over burdened", the Common Pleas judges were "fully occupied in term, and much engaged in vacation also" and the Barons of the Exchequer were "comparatively little occupied either in term or vacation".

In response to this and the report of a committee investigating the slow pace of the Court of Chancery, the Judicature Commission was formed in 1867, and given a wide remit to investigate reform of the courts, the law, and the legal profession. Five reports were issued, from 25 March 1869 to 10 July 1874, with the first (dealing with the formation of a single Supreme Court of Judicature) considered the most influential. The report disposed of the previous idea of merging the common law and equity, and instead suggested a single Supreme Court capable of utilising both. In 1870 the Lord Chancellor, Lord Hatherly, attempted to bring the recommendations into law through an act of Parliament, but did not go to the trouble of consulting the judiciary or the leader of the Conservatives, who controlled the House of Lords. The bill ran into strong opposition from lawyers and judges, particularly Alexander Cockburn. After Hatherly was replaced by Lord Selbourne in September 1872, a second bill was introduced after consultation with the judiciary; although along the same lines, it was far more detailed.

The act, finally passed as the Supreme Court of Judicature Act 1873 (36 & 37 Vict. c. 66), merged the Common Pleas, Exchequer, King's Bench and Court of Chancery into one body, the High Court of Justice, with the divisions between the courts to remain. The Court of Common Pleas thus ceased to exist, except as the Common Pleas Division of the High Court. The existence of the same courts under one unified head was a quirk of constitutional law, which prevented the compulsory demotion or retirement of Chief Justices. By sheer chance, both the Lord Chief Justice of England and Wales and Chief Baron of the Exchequer died in 1880, allowing for the abolition of the Common Pleas Division and Exchequer Division by Order in Council on 16 December 1880, with their functions merged into the King's Bench Division, with the Lord Chief Justice of the Common Pleas becoming Lord Chief Justice of England and Wales.

== Jurisdiction ==
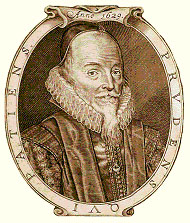
Sir Edward Coke, who called the court "the lock and key of the common law".

The Common Pleas' jurisdiction was over "common pleas," cases where the king had no interest. This in practice meant cases between subject and subject, including all actions taken under praecipe to recover debts or property, which made up the vast majority of civil cases. As such, the Common Pleas "was the court which more than any other shaped the medieval common law". It was the court where most students went to learn, and the majority of the early case reports come from the Common Pleas. The court was called "the lock and key of the common law" by Sir Edward Coke, since throughout its history it was the only court where claims involving real property could be brought, giving it a wider remit to set precedent than the other courts. For almost all of its history, Serjeants at Law and King's Serjeants were the only advocates given rights of audience in the Court of Common Pleas. As part of the Court of Common Pleas the Serjeants also performed some judicial duties, such as levying fines. In 1834 Lord Brougham issued a mandate which opened up pleading in the Court of Common Pleas to every barrister, Serjeant or not, and this was followed for six years until the Serjeants successfully petitioned the Queen to overturn it as invalid. The Serjeants only enjoyed their returned status for another six years, however, before Parliament intervened. The Practitioners in Common Pleas Act 1846, from 18 August 1846, allowed all barristers to practice in the Court of Common Pleas.

From the 13th century onwards, the Court of Common Pleas could issue its own writs, and was not dependent on the Court of Chancery, where such documents usually originated. These were sealed with the Great Seal of the King until at least 1338, along with the seal of the justices; the Chancery writs had their own independent seal. Documents were, from 1350, considered acceptable if only marked with the seal of the justices. In 1344, the king created a separate seal for the Common Pleas, allowing them to process cases without involving the Chancery or the king. The court stood on an equal footing with the Exchequer of Pleas, Court of Chancery and King's Bench in relation to transferring cases between them. Any errors on the part of the Common Pleas would be corrected by the King's Bench through a separate action brought there. Thanks to the Bill of Middlesex and other legal fictions, the King's Bench gained much of the Common Pleas's jurisdiction, although the Common Pleas remained the sole place where real property claims could be brought.

== Structure ==
=== Justices ===
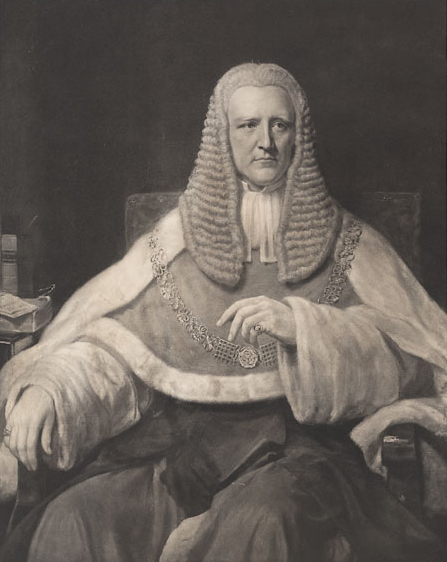
John Coleridge, the last Chief Justice of the Common Pleas.

The Common Pleas was staffed by a number of justices, under one Chief Justice. The number of Justices at any one time varied; between 1377 and 1420 there were generally four, switching to five from 1420 to 1471. From 1471 onwards, the number was fixed at three. This changed in the 19th century; provisions were made for the appointment of fourth and fifth justices in 1830 and 1868 respectively. From the start of the 14th century, Justices were appointed via letters patent made under the Great Seal, and held their appointments "under the pleasure of the King". Justices received the same remuneration as judges of the Exchequer of Pleas and Court of King's Bench; £1,000 in 1660, increased to £2,000 in 1759 and £4,000 in 1809. From 1799, pensions were also awarded to retiring justices. The Chief Justice was one of the highest judicial officials in England, behind only the Lord High Chancellor of England and the Lord Chief Justice of the King's (or Queen's) Bench. Initially the position of Chief Justice was not an appointment; of the justices serving in the court, one would become more respected than his peers, and was therefore considered the "chief" justice. The position was formalised in 1272 with the raising of Sir Gilbert of Preston to Chief Justice, and from then on it was considered a formally appointed role similar to the positions of Chief Justice of the King's Bench and Chief Baron of the Exchequer.

Both the puisne and chief justices were required to be Serjeants-at-Law, and were appointed by letters patent. The Serjeant would then be greeted by the Lord Chancellor, who would inform him of his new position; the letters patent would then be read out in court, and the new justice would swear an oath to do "justice without favour, to all men pleading before him, friends and foes alike", not to "delay to do so even though the king should command him by his letters or by word of mouth to the contrary" or "receive from anyone except the king any fee or other pension or livery nor take any gift from the pleaders before him, except food and drink of no great price". The innovation of appointment by letters patent was a scheme of Edward III's to avoid the potential for bribery, by providing a method through which judges could be paid. This income was supplemented through work on commissions of assize, gaol deliveries, and oyer and terminer. The justice would also receive fees from the parties in court, through the costs of judicial writs.

=== Other offices ===
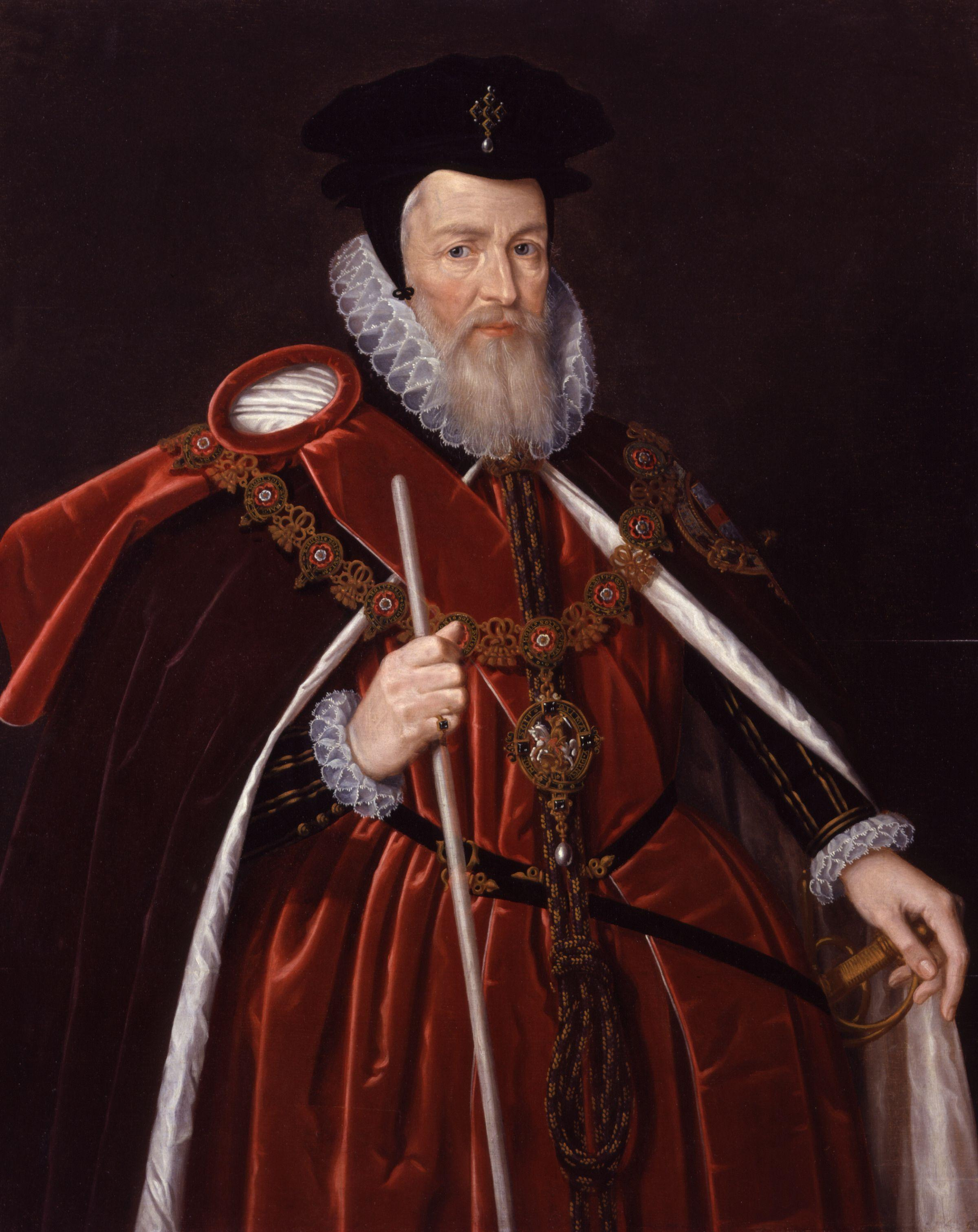
William Cecil, who served as Custos Brevium.

The justices were assisted by a staff of over 50 officials, most of whom sat in Westminster Hall but also kept offices at the various Inns of Court. The Chief Clerk was the Custos Brevium, appointed by the crown, but in practice clerking matters were handled by his deputy, as the office was a royal favour rather than a serious judicial appointment. The crown also appointed the court chirographer, the officer responsible for noting final concords and filing records of fines. Another high-ranking clerk was the Clerk of the Outlawries, an under-clerk of the Attorney General for England and Wales, who was tasked with recording recognizances to protect the interests of the King in common law matters. In 1541 his position was replaced with the office of Clerk of the King's Process. Other offices created during the reign of Henry VIII include the Clerk of the Recognizances in 1432, who recorded debts secured by recognizances and the office of Receiver of Debts, who was tasked with receiving and recording money coming into the court via debts and fines, and was first appointed in 1536.

Due to their technical knowledge, the most important officers were the three Prothonotaries, the first and third of whom were appointed by the Chief Justice and the second by the Chief Justice on the advice of the Custos Brevium. They were responsible for enrolling records of litigation, including anything that raised a point of law, and were often consulted by the court due to their detailed technical knowledge. The Chief Justice also appointed the Clerk of the Warrants, Clerk of the Treasury (also known as the Clerk of Hell), the Keeper of the Seal, the Clerk of Essoins and the Clerk of Acknowledgments of Fines and Recoveries (who was officially the Chief Justice's own clerk, rather than that of the court), as well as other officials. The Custos Brevium appointed the Clerk of the Juries, responsible for issuing writs of Habeas Corpus.

There were four Exigenters tasked with issuing and controlling the process of declaring someone an Outlaw, with each Exigenter assigned a set of counties. The most valuable of the Exigenterships was that for London, Middlesex, Sussex, Kent, Dorset, Somerset, Devon, Cambridgeshire, Huntingdonshire, Bristol and Exeter due to the number of processes each year, with London alone handling over 100 documents a year by the mid-1550s. By tradition the Exigenter for Yorkshire and the other northern counties was also Filazer for Northumberland, Westmorland, Cumberland and Newcastle, and Clerk of the King's Silver for the entire country. There were also thirteen Filazers, who shared counties between them according to historical divisions, and were tasked with filing judicial writs for their counties and transferring them to the Custos Brevium for filing. A fourteenth Filazer was appointed for Monmouthshire in 1542, but other than this there were no changes to the position until the abolition of the court.

The Warden of the Fleet Prison, who was also keeper of Westminster Hall, was tasked with keeping it clean and letting the shops and booths along the sides. Despite acting as gaoler to the Exchequer of Pleas, Court of Chancery and Star Chamber as part of his duties the Warden was considered an officer of the Court of Common Pleas. All court officers were appointed for life, and could only be removed for misbehaviour. Despite this, the sheer number of positions meant that several came up for reappointment in each Chief Justice's tenure, and selling them could be very profitable.

== See also ==
- Court of Common Pleas

== Bibliography ==
- Adams, George Burton (1920). "Origin of the English Courts of Common Law". Yale Law Journal. 30 (8). Yale University. ISSN 0044-0094.
- Baker, J.H (2003). The Oxford History of the Laws of England Volume IV. Oxford University Press. ISBN 0-19-825817-8.
- Castor, Helen (2024). The Eagle and the Hart: The Tragedy of Richard II and Henry IV.
- Cecil Mead Draper, The Court of Common Pleas, 21 Dicta 105 (1944).
- Baker, J.H. (2002). An Introduction to English Legal History. Butterworths. ISBN 0-406-93053-8.
- Boyer, Allen D. (2003). Sir Edward Coke and the Elizabethan Age. Stanford University Press. ISBN 0-8047-4809-8.
- Bryson, W.H. (2008). The Equity Side of the Exchequer. Cambridge University Press. ISBN 978-0-521-07659-3.
- Hamlin, Elbert B. (1935). "The Court of Common Pleas". Connecticut Bar Journal. 9 (1). ISSN 0010-6070.
- Hastings, Margaret (1947). The Court of Common Pleas in Fifteenth Century England: A study of legal administration and procedure. Cornell University Press. OCLC 408377.
- Haydn, Joseph (1851). The book of dignities: containing rolls of the official personages of the British Empire from the earliest periods to the present time together with the sovereigns of Europe, from the foundation of their respective states; the peerage of England and Great Britain. Longmans. OCLC 5281608.
- Ibbetson, David (1984). "Sixteenth Century Contract Law: Slade's Case in Context". Oxford Journal of Legal Studies. 4 (3). Oxford University Press: 295–317. doi:10.1093/ojls/4.3.295. ISSN 0143-6503.
- Kemp, Brian (1973). "Exchequer and Bench in the Later Twelfth Century -- Separate or Identical Tribunals?". The English Historical Review. 88 (348). Oxford University Press. ISSN 0013-8266.
- Kiralfy, A.K.R (1962). Potter's Historical Introduction to English Law and Its Institutions. London: Sweet & Maxwell, Ltd.
- Manchester, A.H. (1980). Modern Legal History. Butterworths. ISBN 0-406-62264-7.
- Megarry, Robert (1972). Inns Ancient and Modern. Selden Society. ISBN 0-85490-006-3.
- Polden, Patrick (2002). "Mingling the waters: personalities, politics and the making of the Supreme Court of Judicature". Cambridge Law Journal. 61 (3). Cambridge University Press. doi:10.1017/S0008197302001745. ISSN 0008-1973. S2CID 144219482.
- Pulling, Alexander (1884). The Order of the Coif. William Clows & Sons Ltd. OCLC 2049459.
- Pugsley, David (2004). "Coleridge, Sir John Taylor". Oxford Dictionary of National Biography (online ed.). Oxford University Press. doi:10.1093/ref:odnb/5887. (Subscription, Wikipedia Library access or UK public library membership required.)
- Sainty, John (1993). The Judges of England 1272 -1990: a list of judges of the superior courts. Oxford: Selden Society. OCLC 29670782.
- Simpson, A.W.B. (2004). Allen D. Boyer (ed.). The Place of Slade's Case in the History of Contract. Law, Liberty and Parliament: Selected Essays on the Writings of Sir Edward Coke. Liberty Fund. ISBN 0-86597-426-8.
- Turner, Ralph V. (1977). "The Origins of Common Pleas and King's Bench". The American Journal of Legal History. 21 (3). Temple University: 238–254. doi:10.2307/844792. ISSN 0002-9319. JSTOR 844792.
- Warren, Edward (1942). "Serjeants-at-Law; The Order of the Coif". Virginia Law Review. 28 (7). University of Virginia School of Law: 911–950. doi:10.2307/1068630. ISSN 0042-6601. JSTOR 1068630.
- Wilkinson, B. (1927). "The Seals of the Two Benches under Edward III". The English Historical Review. 42 (167). Oxford University Press. ISSN 0013-8266.
