= Campling =

Campling is a surname. Notable people with the surname include:

- Christopher Campling (1925–2020), Anglican priest;
- Frederick Campling (1908–1945), English cricketer and airman;
- Roy Campling (1892–1977), Australian cricketer.

== See also ==
- Camplin
