= Bill of Middlesex =

English legal fiction used by the Court of King's Bench until 1832

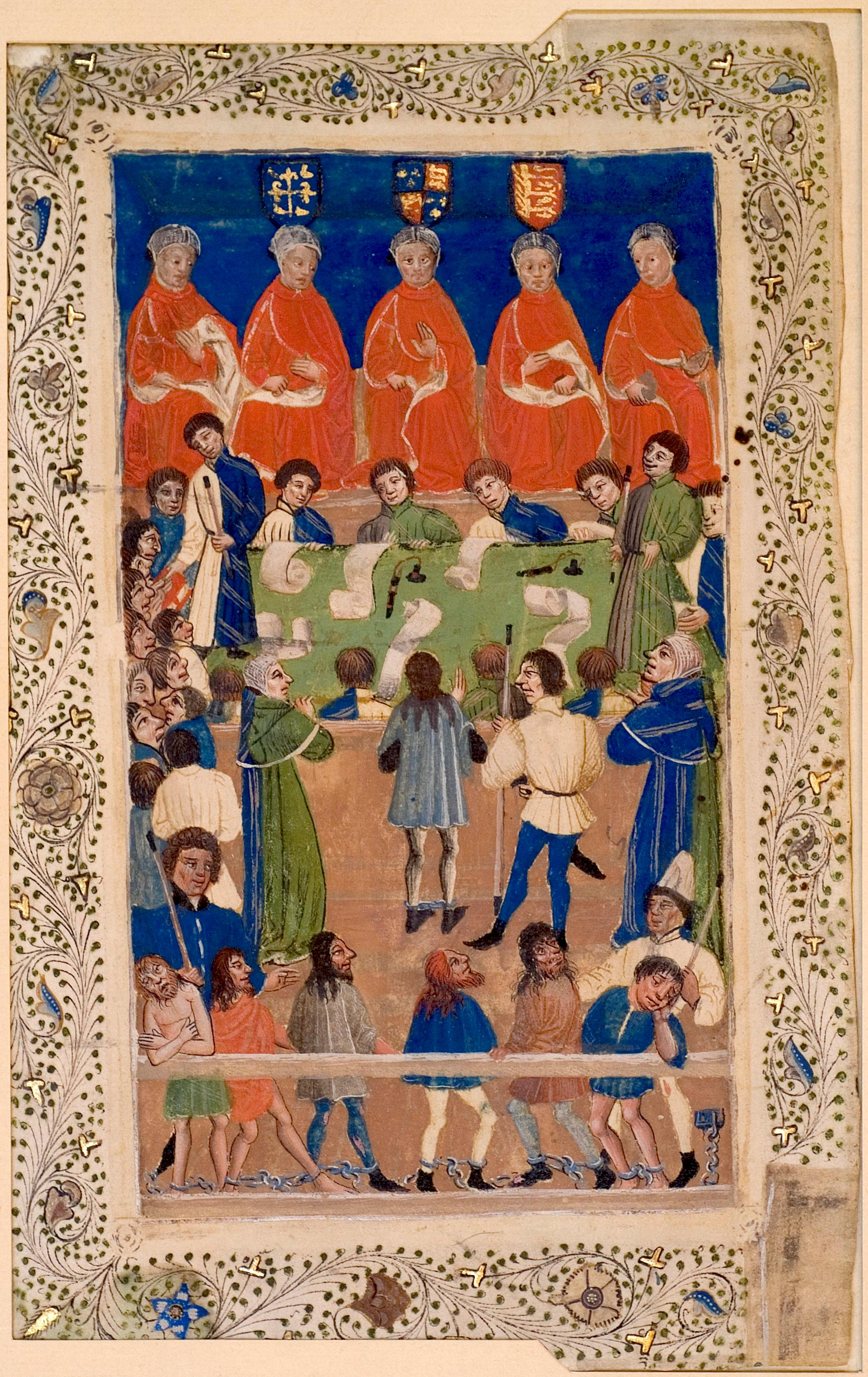
The Court of King's Bench, where the Bill of Middlesex was created and used

The Bill of Middlesex was a legal fiction used by the Court of King's Bench to gain jurisdiction over cases traditionally in the remit of the Court of Common Pleas. Hinging on the King's Bench's remaining criminal jurisdiction over the county of Middlesex, the Bill allowed it to take cases traditionally in the remit of other common law courts by claiming that the defendant had committed trespass in Middlesex. Once the defendant was in custody, the trespass complaint would be quietly dropped and other complaints (such as debt or detinue) would be substituted.

The bill was part of a large reform movement to prevent equitable courts such as the Court of Chancery from undermining their business. It was far cheaper and faster than the older equivalents used by the Chancery and Common Pleas, leading to a drop in their business and an increase in that of the King's Bench. As such, the Chancery issued injunctions in an ineffective attempt to prevent its use. The bill was finally abolished by the Uniformity of Process Act 1832 (2 & 3 Will. 4. c. 39).

As a result of reforming actions such as the Bill of Middlesex, the Common Pleas became increasingly conservative and resistant to King's Bench changes because of the impact they had on the business of the Common Pleas. This was best emphasised by Slade's Case, a struggle between the old and new forms of suing for breach of contract; although an equilibrium between the common law courts was finally reached, it eventually led to their dissolution with the Supreme Court of Judicature Act 1873, and merger into a single High Court of Justice.

== Background ==
The Court of Common Pleas and Court of King's Bench were two of the central common law courts in England and Wales from the 13th century until their dissolution in 1875. The Common Pleas' jurisdiction was over "common pleas", cases where the king had no interest. This in practice meant cases between subject and subject, including all actions taken under praecipe to recover debts or property, which made up the vast majority of civil cases. The jurisdiction of the King's Bench, on the other hand, was over "pleas of the crown": cases which involved the king in some way. With the exception of revenue matters, which were handled by the Exchequer of Pleas, the King's Bench held exclusive jurisdiction over these cases. Crucially, it retained some criminal jurisdiction over all cases in Middlesex, the county where it sat.

During the 15th century, the traditional superiority of the common law courts was challenged by ecclesiastical courts and the equitable jurisdiction of the Lord Chancellor, exercised through the Court of Chancery. These courts were more attractive to the common lawyers because of their informality and the simple method used to arrest defendants. The bills of complaint and subpoena used by the Chancery made court procedure far faster, and from 1460 to 1540 there was a steep decline in the number of cases in the common law courts, coinciding with a sharp increase in cases in the newer courts. This loss of business was quickly recognised by the King's Bench, which was urged by Fairfax J in 1501 to develop new remedies so that "subpoenas would not be used as often as they are at present". From 1500 the King's Bench began reforming to increase its business and jurisdiction, with the tide finally turning in their favour by 1550. The King's Bench significantly reformed its mode of practice in response, and one of the developments was the Bill of Middlesex.

== Bill ==
The Bill of Middlesex exploited the King's Bench's remaining criminal jurisdiction over Middlesex. Prior to the introduction of bills, a writ would have to be issued, with different writs depending on the issue.

If A wished to sue B for trespass, debt and detinue, the court would have to issue an individual writ for each action, with associated delays and costs for A, and then ensure that B appeared in court. Bills, on the other hand, were traditionally used against court officials and the court's prisoners; as such, the defendant was assumed to already be in the court's custody and presence in court was unnecessary.

Thus a legal fiction arose: if A wished to sue B for trespass, debt and detinue, he would have a writ issued for trespass. B would be arrested as a result, and the detinue and debt actions undertaken by bill after he had been detained.

Eventually it became even more fictitious: if A wished to sue B merely for debt and detinue, a trespass writ would be obtained and then quietly dismissed when B was detained in custody. This was originally undertaken through getting a writ of trespass from the Chancery, but eventually a shorter workaround was used: as the King's Bench retained criminal jurisdiction over Middlesex, the trespass (which was fictitious anyway) would be said to have occurred in that county, allowing the King's Bench to issue its own bill of arrest.

This became known as the Bill of Middlesex, and undermined the jurisdiction of the Court of Common Pleas, which normally dealt with such civil cases.

== Impact ==
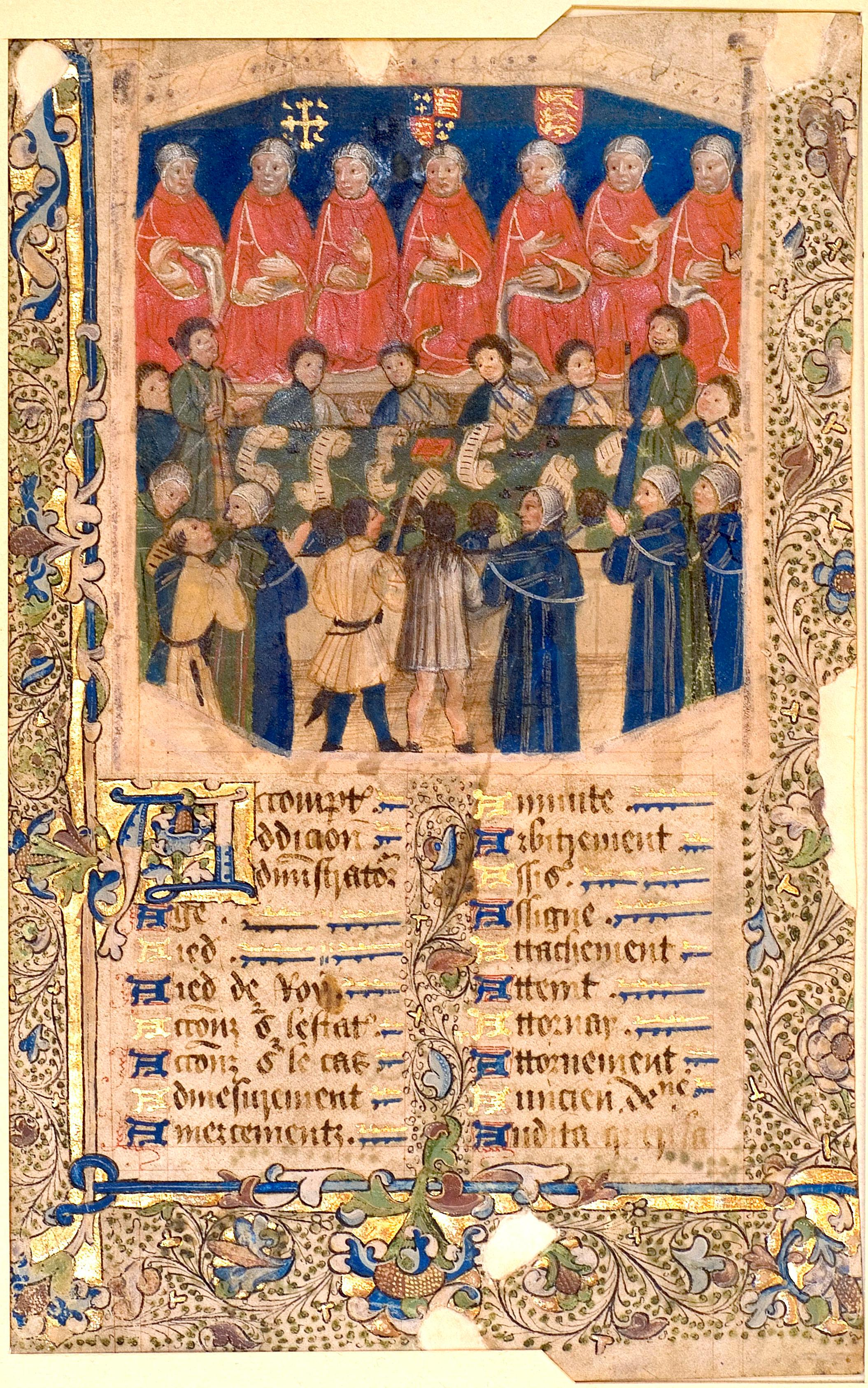
The Court of Common Pleas. Vellum manuscript, circa 1460

As a result of the procedural changes, including the Bill of Middlesex, the King's Bench's business rose tenfold between 1560 and 1640. The simplicity and low cost of this procedure drove much business to the King's Bench, which had a negative impact on the Court of Common Pleas and Court of Chancery. Historically, cases now covered by the Bill of Middlesex had been handled by the Common Pleas, using a specialist writ drafted by the Chancery. This writ was very expensive, and as such brought large amounts of revenue to the Chancery and the Common Pleas. Costs varied depending on the amount of money being claimed from the defendant; it was 6 shillings and 8 pence to claim £40, 10 shillings for £100, and £5 for £1,000. In return, the Chancery began to bring injunctions against those who claimed Bills of Middlesex, "whereby [the judges] are hindered of their fine which should have been paid in [the Chancery] upon the original of the said case". These injunctions were only temporary; "once the fine had been paid there was nothing to prevent a continuation of proceedings in King’s Bench". Relatively few injunctions were issued, and thanks to technical loopholes "it was a weapon too infrequently used, and too easily parried" to have any long-term impact. The issuing of injunctions finally ended in 1590, after an ordinance passed by James I increased the costs of King's Bench proceedings. The Bill of Middlesex itself was finally abolished by the Uniformity of Process Act 1832.

As a longer term and more significant development, the Bill of Middlesex was one of several revolutionary developments by the King's Bench met with a conservative reaction from the Common Pleas, fearful of losing its own caseload. The troubles during this period are best illustrated by Slade's Case. Under the medieval common law, claims seeking the repayment of a debt or other matters could only be pursued through a writ of debt in the Common Pleas, a problematic and archaic process. By 1558 the lawyers had succeeded in creating another method, enforced by the Court of King's Bench, through the action of assumpsit, which was technically for deceit. The legal fiction used was that by failing to pay after promising to do so, a defendant had committed deceit, and was liable to the plaintiff. The conservative Common Pleas, through the appellate court the Court of Exchequer Chamber, began to overrule decisions made by the King's Bench on assumpsit, causing friction between the courts. In Slade's Case, the Chief Justice of the King's Bench, John Popham, deliberately provoked the Common Pleas into bringing an assumpsit action to a higher court where the Justices of the King's Bench could vote, allowing them to overrule the Common Pleas and establish assumpsit as the main contractual action. After the death of Edmund Anderson, the more activist Francis Gawdy became Chief Justice of the Common Pleas, which briefly led to a less reactionary and more revolutionary Common Pleas.

An equilibrium between the courts was eventually reached, but the result was three common law courts (the Exchequer of Pleas, Common Pleas and King's Bench) with near-identical jurisdictions. By the 18th century, it was customary to speak of the "twelve justices" of the three courts, not distinguishing them, and assize cases were shared equally between them. In 1828, Henry Brougham complained in Parliament:

The jurisdiction of the Court of King's Bench, for example, was originally confined to pleas of the Crown, and then extended to actions where violence was used – actions of trespass, by force; but now, all actions are admissible within its walls, through the medium of a legal fiction, which was adopted for the purpose of enlarging its authority, that every person sued is in the custody of the marshal of the court and may, therefore, be proceeded against for any personal cause of actions. Thus, by degrees, this court has drawn over to itself actions which really belong to ... the Court of Common Pleas. The Court of Common Pleas, however ... never was able to obtain cognizance of – the peculiar subject of King's Bench jurisdiction – Crown Pleas ... the Exchequer has adopted a similar course for, though it was originally confined to the trial of revenue cases, it has, by means of another fiction – the supposition that everybody sued is a debtor to the Crown, and further, that he cannot pay his debt, because the other party will not pay him, – opened its doors to every suitor, and so drawn to itself the right of trying cases, that were never intended to be placed within its jurisdiction.

The result was the Supreme Court of Judicature Act 1873, which unified the Common Pleas, Exchequer, King's Bench and Court of Chancery into one body, the High Court of Justice, with the divisions between the courts to remain. Thus, while the reform epitomised by the Bill of Middlesex aided the King's Bench in the short term, it eventually led to its dissolution.
