= Legal fiction =

Fact assumed for the purpose of a legal rule

A legal fiction is a construct used in law where, in order to facilitate a specific outcome, a position is taken to be true, even if such a position is not literally true. Legal fictions can be employed by the courts or found in legislation.

Legal fictions are different from legal presumptions which assume a certain state of facts until the opposite is proved, such as the presumption of legitimacy.

The term legal fiction is sometimes used in a pejorative way. Jeremy Bentham was a famous historical critic of legal fictions. Proponents of legal fictions, particularly of their use historically, identify legal fictions as "scaffolding around a building under construction".

== Common law examples ==
=== Adoption ===
Child adoption is a legal fiction in that the adoptive parents become the legal parents, notwithstanding the lack of a biological relationship. Once an order or judgment of adoption is entered, the (presumptive) biological parents become legal strangers to the child, legally no longer related nor with any rights related to the child. Conversely, the adoptive parents are legally considered to be parents of the adopted child. A new birth certificate reflecting this is issued, which is a legal fiction.

=== Doctrine of survival ===
If two or more people die within a period of time or in a manner that renders it impossible to tell the order in which they died, the older of the two is considered to have died first. This is in order to safeguard the operation of certain general legal rules, e.g. in inheritance law, where the younger person will inherit the older, hence being able to pass on. If a parent dies alongside a child, who has a child of their own, the rule of the elder predeceasing the child will allow the grandchild (typically) to inherit both, the parent directly and grandparent indirectly, with the parent instantaneously inheriting and then bequeathing.

The doctrine of survival, although still existing in England, has been abolished in many U.S. states by the Uniform Simultaneous Death Act.

=== Ejectment ===
The common law had a procedure whereby title to land could be put in direct issue, called the "writ of right". The defendant could insist on trial by "wager of battle", that is trial by combat, a judicially sanctioned duel. To avoid the plaintiff staking life and limb, a tale was told in the pleadings about how one John Doe leased land from the plaintiff but was ousted by Richard Roe, who claimed a contrary lease from the defendant. Such events would lead to the "mixed action in ejectment", a procedure to determine title via trial by jury. This is the origin of the names John Doe and Richard Roe for anonymous parties. The fiction of Doe, Roe, and the leases was not challenged by the parties unless they wished to stake their life on a trial by combat. Wager of battle fell into disuse by the end of the thirteenth century though it was not abolished in England until 1819.

=== Reasonable person ===
In cases where the court must determine whether a standard has been reached, such as whether a defendant has been negligent, the court frequently uses the legal fiction of the "reasonable person". (Note: The "reasonable person" is also known as the "objective bystander" or "the man on the Clapham omnibus".) This is known as the "objective test", and is far more common than the "subjective test" where the court seeks the viewpoint of the parties (or "subjects"). Sometimes, the court may apply a "mixed test", as in the House of Lords' decision in DPP v Camplin 1978. (Note: In Camplin, in determining whether the defendant had been provoked to murder (an objective test), the jury should be allowed to consider the age of the defendant, who was 15 (a subjective test).)

== English examples ==
=== Jurisdiction of the Exchequer ===
In England, a legal fiction extended the jurisdiction of the Court of the Exchequer to all types of cases involving debt. The Exchequer had a much lighter caseload than the King's Bench and other courts in England. Litigants would commence an action in the Exchequer Court by pleading that they owed money to the King, which they could not pay because their debtor had in turn wrongfully withheld payment to them. The debt owed to the King became a legal fiction in that the original debtor was not entitled to controvert this allegation in order to oust the Exchequer from jurisdiction.

=== Jurisdiction of the Court of King's Bench ===
The Bill of Middlesex was a legal fiction used by the Court of King's Bench to gain jurisdiction over cases traditionally in the remit of the Court of Common Pleas. Hinging on the King's Bench's retaining criminal jurisdiction over the county of Middlesex, the Bill allowed it to take cases traditionally in the remit of other common law courts by claiming that the defendant had committed trespass in Middlesex. Once the defendant was in custody, the trespass complaint would be quietly dropped and other complaints (such as debt or detinue) would be substituted.

=== Resignation from Parliament ===
In 1623, a rule was declared that members of Parliament were given a trust to represent their constituencies and, therefore, were not at liberty to resign. However, an MP who accepted an "office of profit" from the Crown (including appointment as a minister) was obliged to leave the House and seek re-election, because it was thought their independence might be compromised if they were in the monarch's pay.

The device was invented that the MP who wished to quit applied to the Crown for the post of "Steward of the Chiltern Hundreds" or "Steward of the Manor of Northstead" with no duties or income, but legally an office of profit in the monarch's gift. The first MP to avail themself of the Chiltern Hundreds to leave Parliament was John Pitt in 1751. The requirement for ministerial re-election has been abolished, but the "Chiltern Hundreds" mechanism remains to enable MPs to resign.

== Australian examples ==
=== Mabo v Queensland ===
Some legal fictions have been invalidated due to increased historical knowledge and changes in social norms, as in the Mabo case, where the High Court of Australia rejected previous authorities that held that Indigenous Australians were too "low in the scale of social organization" at the time of British settlement to be capable of holding title to land.

== United States examples ==
=== Personification of the res ===
In United States civil law, both federal and state courts have the power to make rulings in rem, meaning "to the thing", which legally binds a piece of property against the whole world. This is in contrast to the typical in personam jurisdiction, which binds legal persons inter partes.

In rem jurisdiction originated in Common Law where the courts needed to adjudicate against property where an owner could not be located, but in the United States, In rem jurisdiction is almost exclusively used to adjudicate civil asset forfeiture, where, even if a presumptive owner is known, i.e. the person from which the assets were seized, the court presumes that such person is not the owner, and names the property itself as the defendant.

Because the property is treated as a party to the case in its own right, courts use in personam styling for case titles, resulting in unusual titles such as United States v. Article Consisting of 50,000 Cardboard Boxes More or Less, Each Containing One Pair of Clacker Balls.

=== Legal personhood ===
Through case law, the United States Supreme Court has created the doctrine of granting corporations similar legal rights as individuals, called legal personhood. In most cases where statutory law or constitutional law grants certain rights to a "person", like the right to enter into contracts, sue or be sued, own property, or enjoy the civil protections granted by the United States constitution, the court holds that such laws apply to corporations as well as individuals.

Exceptions to this include the right to proceed in court In forma pauperis, meaning that corporations could not go to court without paying normal process fees (Rowland v. California Men's Colony, Unit II Men's Advisory Council), and that citizenship could only be held by natural persons (Paul v. Virginia).

=== Constructive fictions ===
In order to ensure that certain laws can be enforced, the courts employ "constructive" fictions, where some literal conditions are considered to "construct" other conditions, even if those conditions are not literally true.

- Constructive Notice - Where a person is considered to have received notice of a case that affects their interest, e.g. a city ordinance, whether or not the person actually received notice, so long as certain procedures are followed, e.g. publication in a newsletter.
- Constructive Possession - Where a person is considered to be in possession of property so long as they have the ability to control it, regardless of if that property is physically in someone's possession.
- Constructive Trust - Used by courts as a remedy for unjust enrichment, constructive trust is a trusteeship created by the courts own power, where a court treats a person who stands to unjustly enrich themselves with a property as holding that property in trust for the purpose of being liable to the person injured.
- Constructive Ownership - Used in tax law to decide who should be treated as the owner of an asset, usually stocks, to assess tax obligations. For example, assets owned by a partnership are considered to be proportionally owned by its partners.
- Constructive Fraud - A party to a contract can be found liable of constructive fraud if they make a misrepresentation of material fact to another party, resulting in damages or injury. It is distinguished from standard fraud, as unlike for standard fraud, the intent to deceive is not a prerequisite for constructive fraud.

== Philosophical arguments ==
William Blackstone defended legal fictions, observing that legislation is never free from the iron law of unintended consequences. Using the metaphor of an ancient castle, Blackstone opined:

We inherit an old Gothic castle, erected in the days of chivalry, but fitted up for a modern inhabitant. The moated ramparts, the embattled towers, and the trophied halls, are magnificent and venerable, but useless. The interior apartments, now converted into rooms of convenience, are cheerful and commodious, though their approaches are winding and difficult.

Henry Maine, on the other hand, argued that legal fictions seem an ornate outgrowth of the law that ought to be removed by legislation. Jeremy Bentham sharply criticised the notion of legal fictions, saying that "fictions are to law what fraud is to trade." John Allison, of the University of Cambridge, makes the case that while some fictions seem extraordinary in theory, legal institutions often domesticate them until they are 'ordinary', and more limited than they might metaphorically seem.

== Use in fiction ==
In the novel Joan and Peter (1918) by H. G. Wells, Peter's parents die in a sailing accident. As it is not known which parent dies first, a legal fiction is applied maintaining that the husband, being a man and therefore stronger, lived longer which results in the father's will determining Peter's legal guardian. Later in the novel a witness to the accident declares seeing the mother floundering some time after the father has disappeared, and so the legal fiction is overturned and the mother's will is followed, providing Peter with a new legal guardian. Wells was in error as to the English law, which actually presumes that the older person died first.

In Act II, Scene 1 of Gilbert and Sullivan's The Gondoliers, Giuseppe Palmieri (who serves jointly with his brother Marco as King of Barataria) requests that he and his brother be recognized individually, that they might receive individual portions of food as they have two independent appetites. He is turned down because the joint rule "... is a legal fiction, and legal fictions are solemn things."

In the novel Lud-in-the-Mist (1926) by Hope Mirrlees, the concept of the legal fiction as a secular substitute for spiritual mysteries and magical illusions is a central theme. Legal fictions in the novel include referring to fairy fruit, mention of which is taboo, as woven silk fabric in order to allow the law to regulate it; and declaring members of the country's Senate "dead in the eyes of the law" in order to remove them from office, since the senators serve for life.

== Limitations on use ==
Legal fictions derive their legitimacy from tradition and precedent, rather than formal standing as a source of law. Historically, many legal fictions were created as ad hoc remedies forged to meet a harsh or an unforeseen situation. Conventions and practices over the centuries have imparted a degree of stability both to the institution of legal fictions and to specific legal fictions (such as adoptions and corporate personhood) that have been repeatedly invoked in judicial precedents. While judiciaries retain discretion in the use of legal fictions, some general propositions regarding the appropriateness of using legal fictions might be expressed as follows:

- A legal fiction should not be employed to defeat law or result in illegality: it has been always stressed that a legal fiction should not be employed where it would result in the violation of any legal rule or moral injunction. In Sinclair v. Brougham 1914 AC 378 the House of Lords refused to extend the juridical basis of a quasi-contract to a case of an ultra vires borrowing by a limited company, since it would sanction the evasion of the rules of public policy forbidding an ultra vires borrowing by a company. In general, if it appears that a legal fiction is being used to circumvent an existing rule, the courts are entitled to disregard that fiction and look at the real facts. The doctrine of "piercing the corporate veil" is applied under those circumstances.
- Legal fiction should operate for the purpose for which it was created and should not be extended beyond its legitimate field.

== Codified legal fictions ==
Some legal fictions are codified in statutory or regulatory law. A person having ordinary skill in the art is an example of such a legal fiction.

== See also ==
- Ad hoc
- Axiom
- Copyright traps
- De jure
- En ventre sa mere
- Fiction
- Person having ordinary skill in the art
