= Plea rolls =

Court terminology

Plea rolls are parchment rolls recording details of legal suits or actions in a court of law in England.

Courts began recording their proceedings in plea rolls and filing writs from their foundation at the end of the 12th century. Most files were kept by the Custos Brevium (established in 1246) but files of writs of covenant were kept by the chirographer because of their association with feet of fines, which were kept separately by the chirographer (established by King John's reign).

The court's records were at first held by its justices and their clerks. From 1257 on, non-current records were passed to the treasury at the Exchequer. From 1288 to 1731, non-current records, plea rolls, files of fines, and writs were transferred from the court to the Treasury of the Receipt of the Exchequer; and thence, eventually, to The National Archives at Kew.

The Plea Rolls for the Courts of Common Pleas and King's Bench are in bundles by law term: Hilary, Easter, Trinity, and Michaelmas, or winter, spring, summer, and autumn. They are in Latin, though some items, such as indentures and direct quotations in cases of defamation, are in English. Most of the plea rolls have not been indexed, but modern indexes for some terms are available.

Plea Rolls for the Courts of Common Pleas, King's Bench, and Exchequer of Pleas, from the 13th century to the 17th, can be viewed at the Anglo-American Legal Tradition site.

== See also ==
- Assize Court
- Henry de Bracton
