= Camplin =

Camplin is a surname. Notable people with the surname include:

- Alisa Camplin (born 1974), Australian aerial skier
- Bonnie Camplin (born 1970), British artist and university lecturer

== See also ==
- DPP v Camplin, 1978 British lawsuit
