= Court of King's Bench (England) =

English common law court (c. 1200–1873)

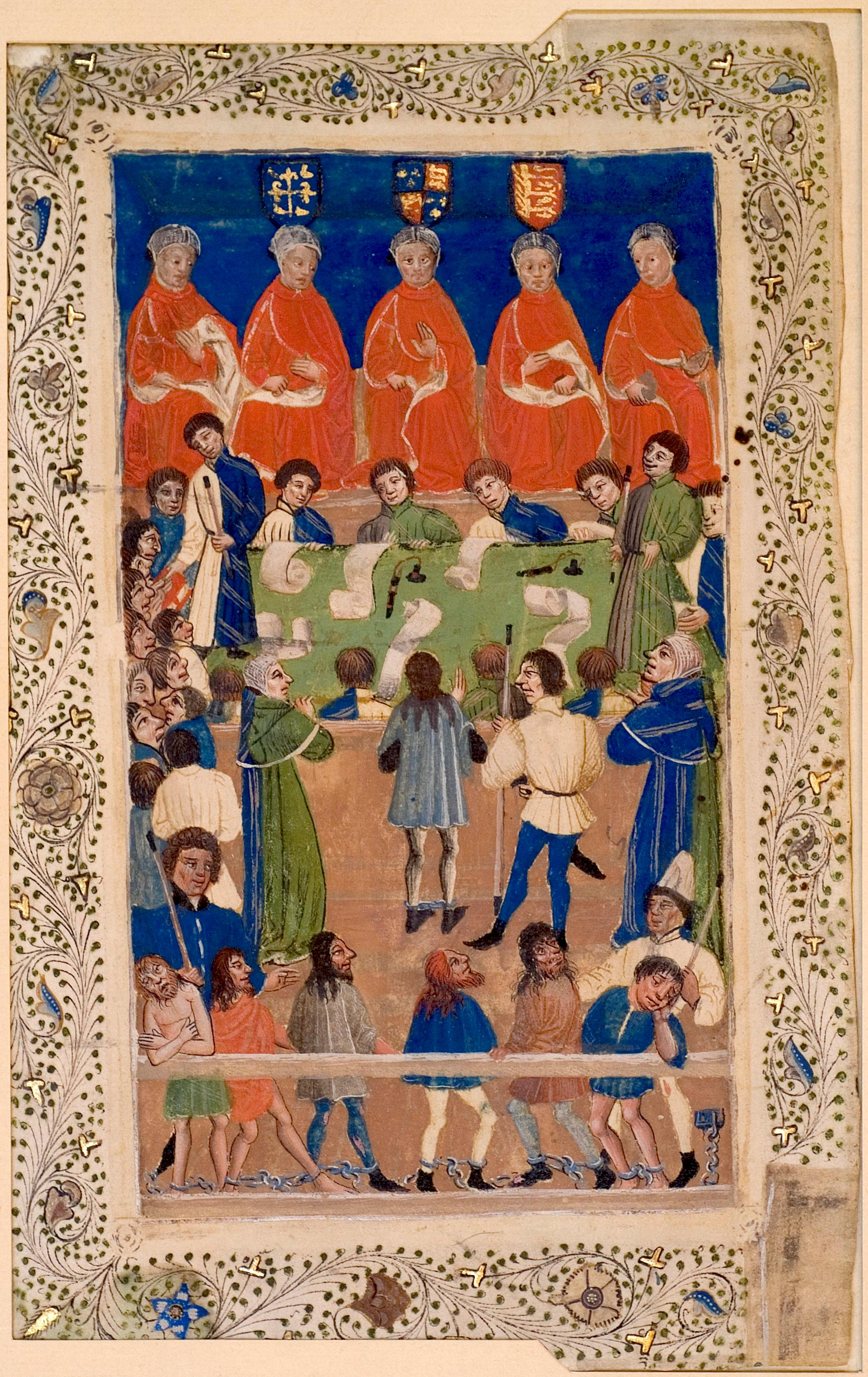
The Court of King's Bench at work. This illuminated manuscript from about 1460 is the earliest known depiction of the English court.

The Court of King's Bench, (Note: The words were duly changed to reflect gender during the reign of a female monarch.) formally known as The Court of the King Before the King Himself, was a court of common law in the English legal system. Created in the late 12th to early 13th century from the curia regis, the King's Bench initially followed the monarch on his travels. The King's Bench finally joined the Court of Common Pleas and Exchequer of Pleas in Westminster Hall in 1318, making its last travels in 1421. The King's Bench was merged into the High Court of Justice by the Supreme Court of Judicature Act 1873, after which point the King's Bench was a division within the High Court. The King's Bench was staffed by one Chief Justice (now the Lord Chief Justice of England and Wales) and usually three Puisne Justices.

In the 15th and 16th centuries, the King's Bench's jurisdiction and caseload was significantly challenged by the rise of the Court of Chancery and equitable doctrines as one of the two principal common law courts along with the Common Pleas. To recover, the King's Bench undertook a scheme of revolutionary reform, creating less expensive, faster and more versatile types of pleading in the form of bills as opposed to the more traditional writs. Although not immediately stemming the tide, it helped the King's Bench to recover and increase its workload in the long term.

There was a steep decline in business from 1460 to 1540. As the new reforms began to take effect the King's Bench's business was significantly boosted. Between 1560 and 1640, it rose tenfold. The Common Pleas became suspicious of the new developments, as legal fictions such as the Bill of Middlesex damaged its own business. Fighting against the King's Bench in a reactionary and increasingly conservative way, an equilibrium was eventually reached in the 17th century until the merger in 1873.

The King's Bench's jurisdiction initially covered a wide range of criminal matters, any business not claimed by the other courts, and any cases concerning the monarch. Until 1830, the King's Bench acted as a court of appeal for the Exchequer of Pleas and Common Pleas, and required Parliament to sign off on its decisions. From 1585, the Court of Exchequer Chamber served for appeals of King's Bench decisions.

== History ==
=== Origins ===
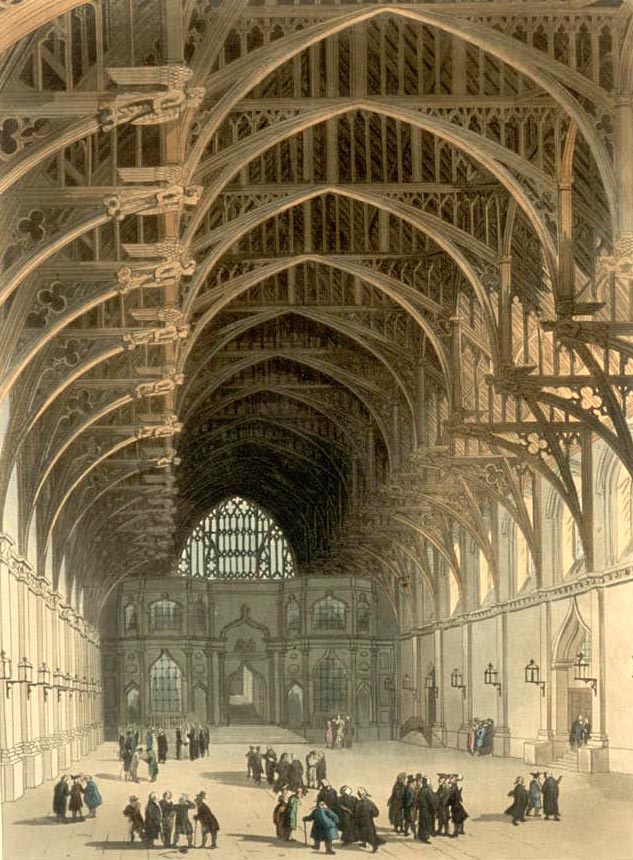
Westminster Hall, where the King's Bench sat until its abolition

Originally, the sole "court" was the curia regis, one of the three central administrative bodies along with the Exchequer and Chancery, from which the Court of Chancery formed. This curia was the King's court, composed of those advisers and courtiers who followed the King as he travelled around the country. This was not a dedicated court of law, instead a descendant of the curia ducis and partly of the witenagemot. In concert with the curia regis, eyre circuits staffed by itinerant judges dispensed justice throughout the country, operating on fixed paths at certain times. These judges were also members of the curia, and would hear cases on the King's behalf in the "lesser curia regis".

Because the curia travelled with the King, there were problems with the administration of justice. For example, if the King left the country for an extended period of time (as Richard I, who spent the vast majority of his reign overseas did), the curia followed, making hearings difficult to hold. To remedy this, a central "bench" was established; the Court of Common Pleas, initially split from the Exchequer of Pleas, received official recognition in the Magna Carta so that common pleas could be heard in "some fixed place". Thus, there were two common law courts: the curia, which followed the King, and the Common Pleas, which sat in Westminster Hall. The curia eventually became known as the King's Bench, with the King himself required to be present for the court to sit.

There is some controversy over whether the original fixed court was the Common Pleas or King's Bench. In 1178, a chronicler recorded that when Henry II:

learned that the land and the men of the land were burdened by so great a number of justices, for there were, eighteen, chose with the counsel of the wise men of his Kingdom five only, two clerks three and laymen, all of his private family, and decreed that these five should hear all complaints of the Kingdom and should do right and should not depart from the king's court but should remain there to hear the complaints of men, with this understanding that, if there should come up among them any question which could not be brought to a conclusion by them, it should be presented to a royal hearing and be determined by the king and the wiser men of the kingdom".

This was originally interpreted as the foundation of the King's Bench, with the Court of Common Pleas not coming into existence until the grant of Magna Carta. The later theory was that Henry II's decree created the Court of Common Pleas, not the King's Bench, and that the King's Bench instead split from the Common Pleas at some later time. The first records of an independent King's Bench come from 1234, when distinct plea rolls are found for each court. Modern academics give 1234 as the founding date for the King's Bench as a fully independent tribunal, considering it part of the law reform which took place from 1232 to 1234. Under Edward I, the presence of the King in the court became more and more irregular, and by 1318 the court sat independent of the monarch. Its last travels around the country were in 1414 to Leicestershire, Staffordshire and Shropshire, and a visit to Northamptonshire in 1421. From then onwards, the King's Bench became a fixed court rather than one that followed the King. Like the Common Pleas, the King's Bench sat in Westminster Hall until its dissolution.

=== Reform ===
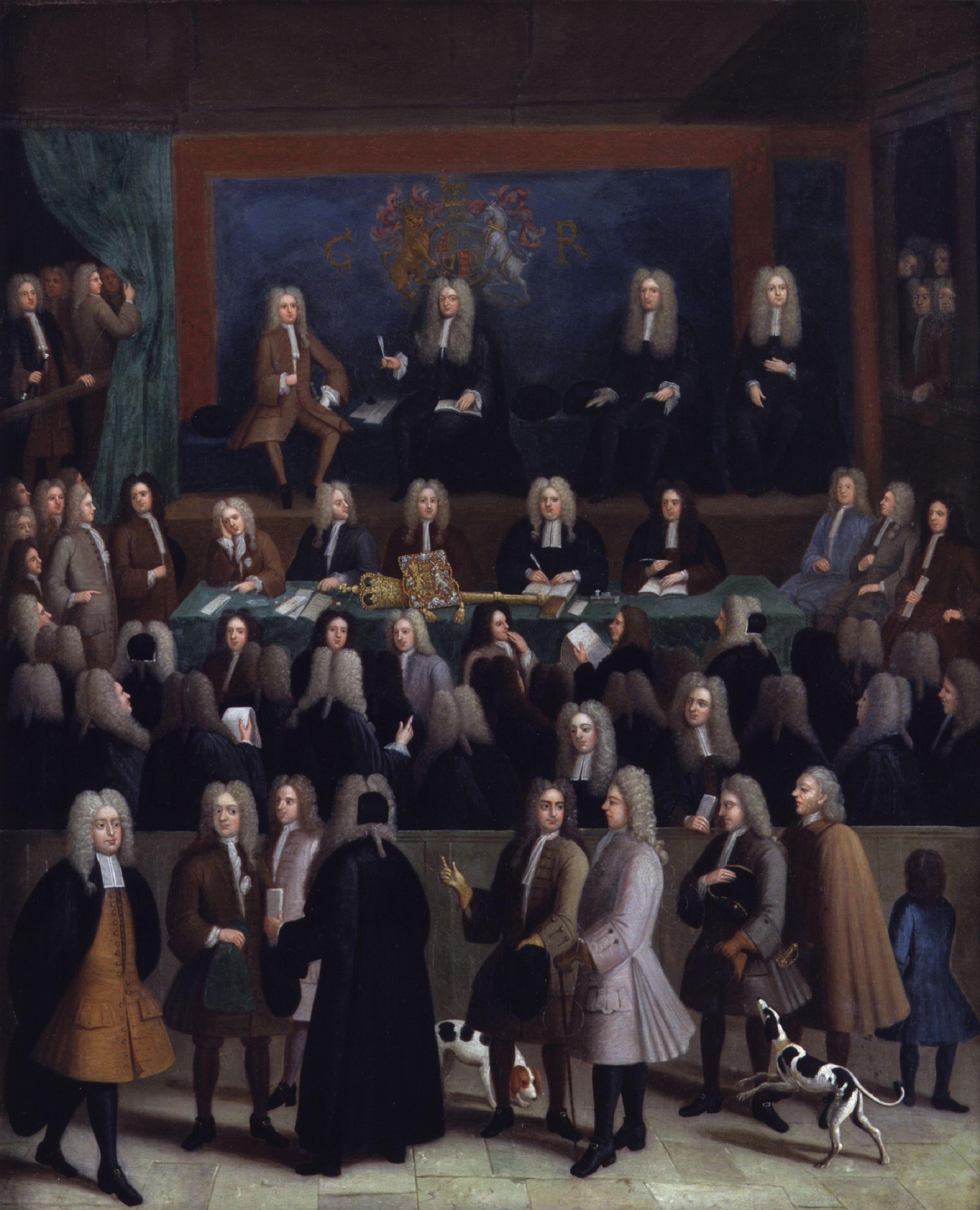
The Court of Chancery, a competitor to the King's Bench and other common law courts during the 15th and 16th centuries

During the 15th century, the traditional superiority of the common law courts was challenged by ecclesiastical courts and the equitable jurisdiction of the Lord Chancellor, exercised through the Court of Chancery. These courts were more attractive to the common lawyers because of their informality and the simple method used to arrest defendants. The bills of complaint and subpoena used by the Chancery made court procedure far faster, and from 1460 to 1540 there was a steep decline in the number of cases in the common law courts, coinciding with a sharp increase in cases in the newer courts. This loss of business was quickly recognised by the King's Bench, which was urged by Fairfax J in 1501 to develop new remedies so that "subpoenas would not be used as often as they are at present". From 1500 the King's Bench began reforming to increase its business and jurisdiction, with the tide finally turning in their favour by 1550.

The recovery of the King's Bench was thanks to its use of Chancery-like procedure; centrally, the system of bills. Prior to this, a writ would have to be issued, with different writs depending on the issue. If A wished to sue B for trespass, debt and detinue, the court would have to issue an individual writ for each action, with associated time delays and costs for A, and then ensure that B appeared in court. Bills, on the other hand, were traditionally used against court officials and the court's prisoners; as such, the defendant was assumed to already be in the court's custody and presence in court was not needed. Thus a legal fiction arose; if A wished to sue B for trespass, debt and detinue, he would have a writ issued for trespass. B would be arrested as a result, and the covenant, detinue and debt actions undertaken by bill after he had been detained.

Eventually it became even more fictitious; if A wished to sue B merely for debt and detinue, a trespass writ would be obtained and then quietly dismissed when B was detained in custody. This was originally undertaken through getting a writ of trespass from the Chancery, but eventually a shorter workaround was used; since the King's Bench retained criminal jurisdiction over Middlesex, the trespass (which was fictitious anyway) would be said to have occurred there, allowing the King's Bench to issue a bill of arrest on its own. This became known as the Bill of Middlesex, and undermined the jurisdiction of the Court of Common Pleas, which would normally deal with such civil cases.

The advantages to this method were that bills were substantially cheaper, and unlike writs did not tie the plaintiff down. Once the case came to court the bill could be amended to include any action or actions the plaintiff wanted to enforce. By avoiding the Chancery writ, the case was substantially cheaper. The result of this was substantial; between 1560 and 1640, the King's Bench's business rose tenfold. This period also saw a substantial broadening of the remedies available in the common law. The main remedy and method was action on the case, which justices expanded to encompass other things. In 1499 it enabled the enforcement of parol promises, which rendered Chancery subpoenas obsolete; later developments included the recovery of debts, suing for defamatory words (previously an ecclesiastical matter) and action on the case for trover and conversion. Most of this reform took place under Fineux CJ, who never lived to see the results of his work; it took over 100 years for the reforms to fully reverse the decline in business.

=== Struggle with the Common Pleas ===
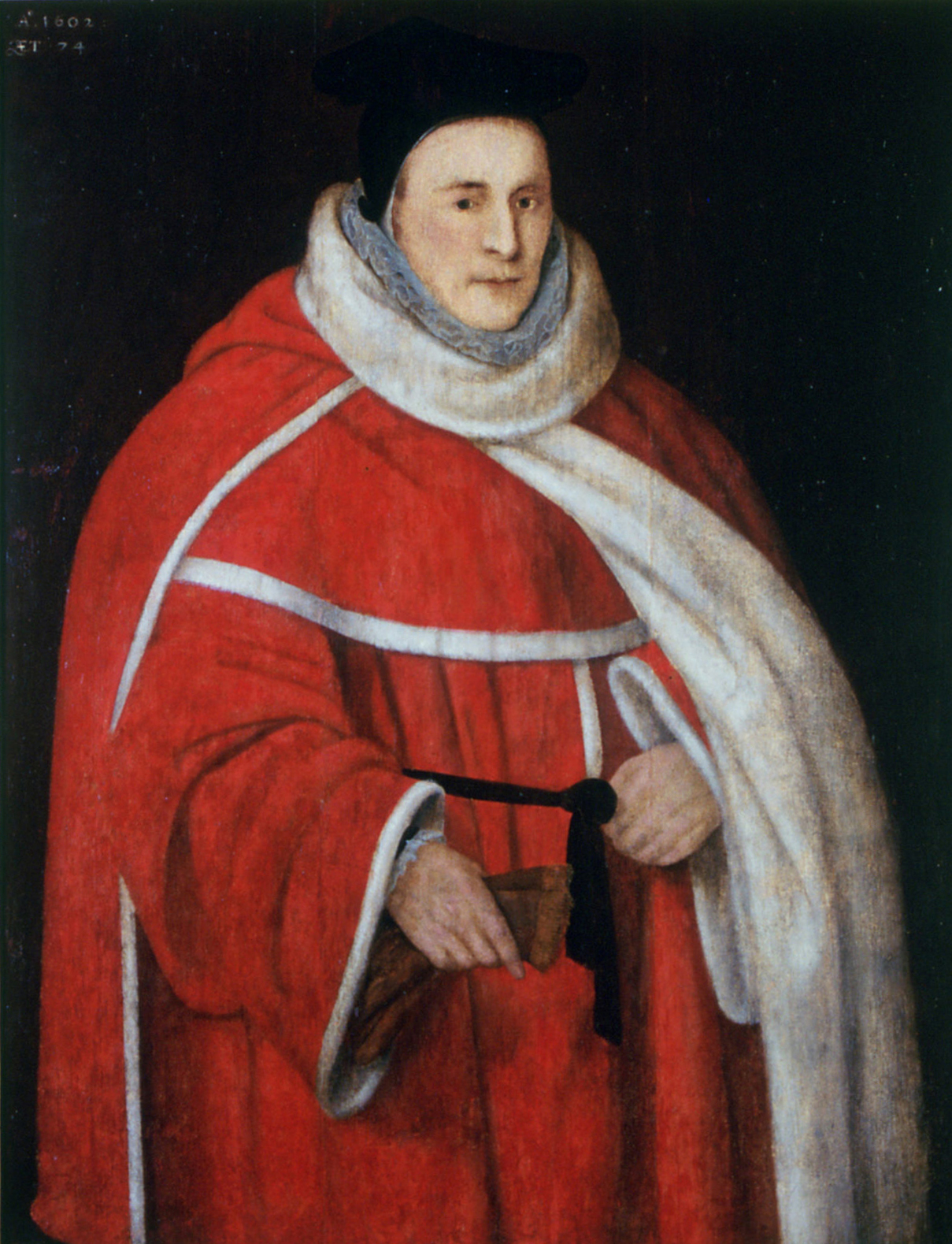
John Popham, the Chief Justice of the King's Bench who brought the Common Pleas and King's Bench into conflict over assumpsit

While these reforms succeeded in forming an equilibrium between the old common law courts and the new courts, they were viewed with suspicion by the Common Pleas, who became highly reactionary to the changes the King's Bench attempted to introduce. While the King's Bench was more revolutionary, the Common Pleas became increasingly conservative in its attempts to avoid ceding cases. The disparity between the reformist King's Bench and conservative Common Pleas was exacerbated by the fact that the three Common Pleas prothonotaries could not agree on how to cut costs, leaving the court both expensive and of limited malleability while the King's Bench became faster, cheaper and more varied in its jurisdiction.

The troubles during this period are best illustrated by Slade's Case. Under the medieval common law, claims seeking the repayment of a debt or other matters could only be pursued through a writ of debt in the Common Pleas, a problematic and archaic process. By 1558 the lawyers had succeeded in creating another method, enforced by the Court of King's Bench, through the action of assumpsit, which was technically for deceit. The legal fiction used was that by failing to pay after promising to do so, a defendant had committed deceit, and was liable to the plaintiff. The conservative Common Pleas, through the appellate court the Court of Exchequer Chamber, began to overrule decisions made by the King's Bench on assumpsit, causing friction between the courts.

In Slade's Case, the Chief Justice of the King's Bench, John Popham, deliberately provoked the Common Pleas into bringing an assumpsit action to a higher court where the Justices of the King's Bench could vote, allowing them to overrule the Common Pleas and establish assumpsit as the main contractual action. After the death of Edmund Anderson, the more activist Francis Gawdy became Chief Justice of the Common Pleas, which briefly led to a less reactionary and more revolutionary Common Pleas.

The struggle continued even after this point. The Interregnum granted some respite to the Common Pleas, which abolished fines on original writs, hurting the King's Bench, but in 1660 the fines were reinstated and "then the very attorneys of the Common Pleas boggled at them and carried all their finable business to the King's Bench". In 1661 the Common Pleas attempted to reverse this by pushing for an Act of Parliament to abolish latitats based on legal fictions, forbidding "special bail" in any case where "the true cause of action" was not expressed in the process.

The King's Bench got around this in the 1670s; the Act did not say that the process had to be true, so the court continued to use legal fictions, simply ensuring that the true cause of action was expressed in the process, regardless of whether or not it was correct. The Bill of Middlessex disclosed the true cause of action, satisfying the 1661 statute, but did not require a valid complaint. This caused severe friction within the court system, and Francis North, Chief Justice of the Common Pleas, eventually reached a compromise by allowing such legal fictions in the Common Pleas as well as the King's Bench.

=== Dissolution ===
The unintended outcome of these compromises was that by the end of Charles II's reign, all three common law courts had a similar jurisdiction over most common pleas, with similar processes. By the 18th century, it was customary to speak of the "twelve justices" of the three courts, not distinguishing them, and assize cases were shared equally between them. In 1828, Henry Brougham complained that:

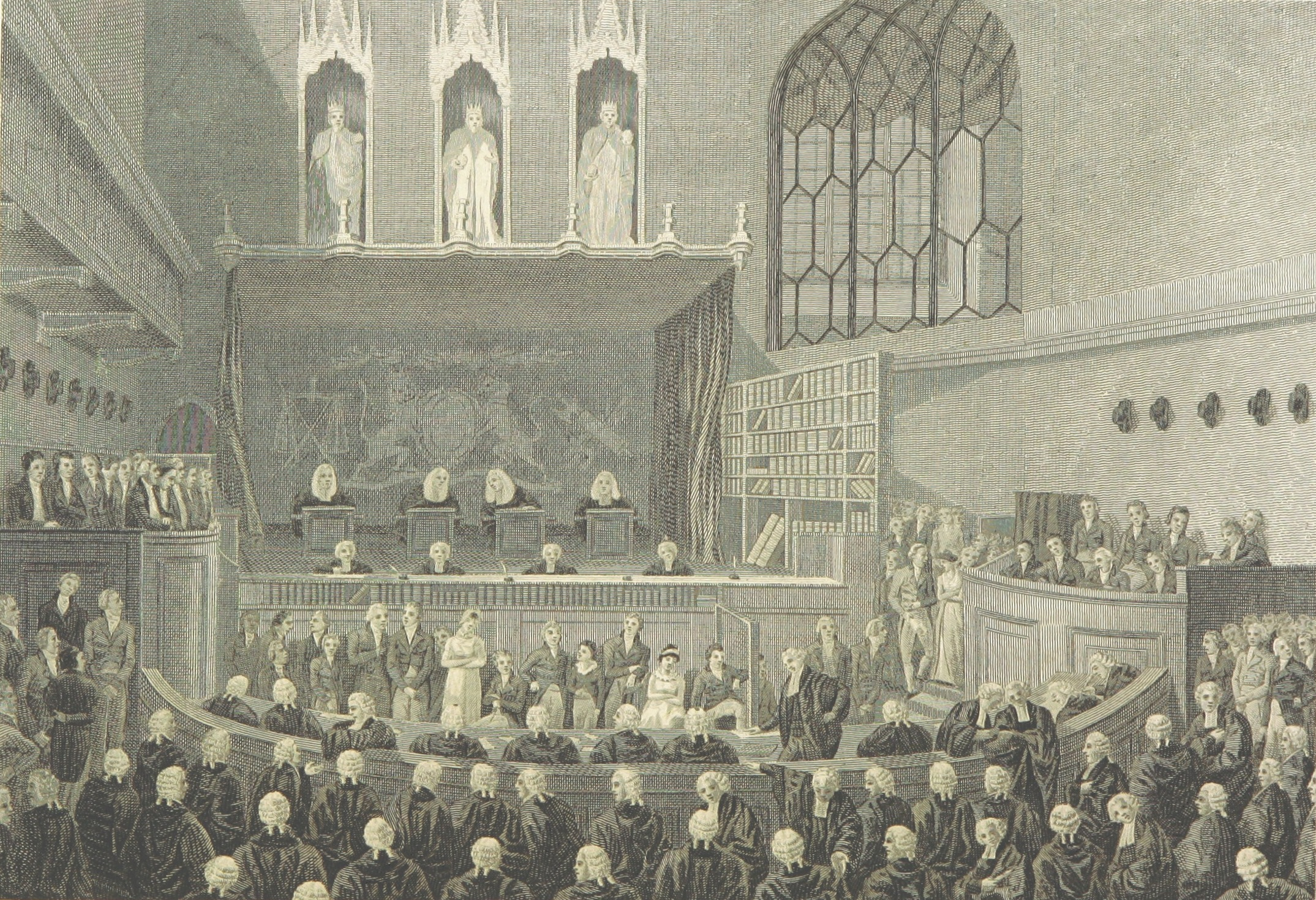
The Court of King's Bench at work in Westminster Hall in the early 19th century

[t]he jurisdiction of the Court of King's Bench, for example, was originally confined to pleas of the Crown, and then extended to actions where violence was used – actions of trespass, by force; but now, all actions are admissible within its walls, through the medium of a legal fiction, which was adopted for the purpose of enlarging its authority, that every person sued is in the custody of the marshal of the court and may, therefore, be proceeded against for any personal cause of actions. Thus, by degrees, this court has drawn over to itself actions which really belong to...the Court of Common Pleas. The Court of Common Pleas, however...never was able to obtain cognizance of – the peculiar subject of King's Bench jurisdiction – Crown Pleas... the Exchequer has adopted a similar course for, though it was originally confined to the trial of revenue cases, it has, by means of another fiction – the supposition that everybody sued is a debtor to the Crown, and further, that he cannot pay his debt, because the other party will not pay him, – opened its doors to every suitor, and so drawn to itself the right of trying cases, that were never intended to be placed within its jurisdiction.

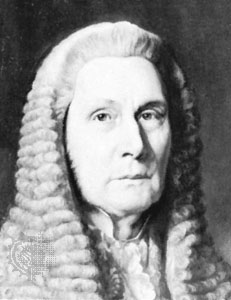
Lord Selborne, the Lord Chancellor who oversaw the passage of the Supreme Court of Judicature Act 1873, merging the Common Pleas, Exchequer, King's Bench and Court of Chancery into one body, the High Court of Justice.

The purpose of Brougham's speech was to illustrate that three courts of identical jurisdiction were unnecessary, and further that it would create a situation where the best judges, lawyers and cases would eventually go to one court, overburdening that body and leaving the others near useless. In 1823, 43,465 actions were brought in the King's Bench, 13,009 in the Common Pleas and 6,778 in the Exchequer of Pleas. Not surprisingly, the King's Bench judges were "immoderately over burdened", the Common Pleas judges were "fully occupied in term, and much engaged in vacation also" and the Barons of the Exchequer were "comparatively little occupied either in term or vacation".

In response to this and the report of a committee investigating the slow pace of the Court of Chancery, the Judicature Commission was formed in 1867, and given a wide remit to investigate reform of the courts, the law, and the legal profession. Five reports were issued, from 25 March 1869 to 10 July 1874, with the first (dealing with the formation of a single Supreme Court of Judicature) considered the most influential. The report disposed of the previous idea of merging the common law and equity, and instead suggested a single Supreme Court capable of using both.

In 1870 the Lord Chancellor, Lord Hatherly, attempted to bring the recommendations into law through an act of Parliament, but did not go to the trouble of consulting the judiciary or the leader of the Conservatives, who controlled the House of Lords. The bill ran into strong opposition from lawyers and judges, particularly Alexander Cockburn. After Hatherly was replaced by Lord Selborne in September 1872, a second bill was introduced after consultation with the judiciary; although along the same lines, it was far more detailed.

The act, passed as the Supreme Court of Judicature Act 1873, merged the Common Pleas, Exchequer, Queen's Bench and Court of Chancery into one body, the High Court of Justice, with the divisions between the courts to remain. The Queen's Bench thus ceased to exist, holding its last session on 6 July 1875, except as the Queen's Bench Division of the High Court. The existence of the same courts as divisions of one unified body was a quirk of constitutional law, which prevented the compulsory demotion or retirement of Chief Justices. Thus all three Chief Justices (Lord Chief Justice Sir Alexander Cockburn, Chief Justice of the Common Pleas Lord Coleridge and Chief Baron of the Exchequer Sir Fitzroy Kelly) continued in post. Kelly and Cockburn died in 1880, allowing for the abolition of the Common Pleas Division and Exchequer Division by Order in Council on 16 December 1880. The High Court was reorganised into the Chancery Division, Queen's Bench Division and the Probate, Divorce and Admiralty Division.

== Jurisdiction ==
English courts prior to 1830

Due to a misunderstanding by Sir Edward Coke in his Institutes of the Lawes of England, academics thought for a long time that the King's Bench was primarily a criminal court. This was factually incorrect; no indictment was tried by the King's Bench until January 1323, and no record of the court ordering the death penalty is found until halfway through Edward II's reign. The court did have some criminal jurisdiction, with a royal ordinance in 1293 directing conspiracy cases to be brought to the King's Bench and the court's judges acting in trailbaston commissions around the country.

A. T. Carter, in his History of English Legal Institutions, defines the early King's Bench jurisdiction as "to correct all crimes and misdemeanours that amounted to a breach of the peace, the King being then plaintiff, for such were in derogation of the Jura regalia; and to take cognizance of everything not parcelled out to the other courts". By the end of the 14th century much of the criminal jurisdiction had declined, although the court maintained a criminal jurisdiction over all cases in Middlesex, the county where Westminster Hall stood. The King's Bench's main jurisdiction was over "pleas of the crown"; cases which involved the King in some way. With the exception of revenue matters, which were handled by the Exchequer of Pleas, the King's Bench held exclusive jurisdiction over these cases.

The Court of King's Bench did act as an appellate body, hearing appeals from the Court of Common Pleas, eyre circuits, assize courts and local courts, but was not a court of last resort; its own records were sent to Parliament to be signed off on. The creation of the Court of Exchequer Chamber in 1585 created a court from which King's Bench decisions could be appealed to, and with the expansion of the Exchequer Chamber's jurisdiction in 1830 the King's Bench ceased to be an appellate court. Thanks to the Bill of Westminster and other legal fictions, the King's Bench gained much of the Common Pleas's jurisdiction, although the Common Pleas remained the sole place where real property claims could be brought.

== Officials ==
The head of the court was the Chief Justice of the King's Bench, a position established by 1268. From the 14th century onwards, the Chief Justice was appointed by a writ, in Latin until 1727 and in English from then on. The Chief Justice was the most senior judge in the superior courts, having superiority over the Chief Justice of the Common Pleas and Chief Baron of the Exchequer, and from 1612 the Master of the Rolls. Unlike other Chief Justices, who were appointed to serve "during the King's Pleasure", the appointment as Chief Justice of the King's Bench "did not usually specify any particular tenure".

This practice ended in 1689, when all of the Chief Justices became appointed to serve "during good behaviour". The initial salary was £40 a year, with an additional £66 in 1372 and an increase to a total of £160 in 1389. An ordinance of 1646 set a fixed salary of £1,000, increased to £2,000 in 1714, £4,000 in 1733, and finally peaked at £10,000 a year in 1825. Pension arrangements were first made in 1799, peaking at £4,000 a year in 1825. The position remains to this day; after the dissolution of the Court of King's Bench, the Chief Justice has instead been the Lord Chief Justice of England and Wales, now the head of the Judiciary of England and Wales.

A Chief Justice of the King's Bench was assisted in his work by a number of Justices of the King's Bench. Occasionally appointed before 1272, the number fluctuated considerably between 1 and 4; from 1522, the number was fixed at 3. Provisions for a fourth were established in 1830, and a fifth in 1868. Following the dissolution of the Court of King's Bench, the remaining Justices because Justices of the Queen's Bench Division of the High Court of Justice. Justices were originally paid £26 a year, increasing to £66 in 1361, and £100 in 1389. An ordinance of 1645 increased this to £1,000, with the salary peaking at £5,500 in 1825. As with the Chief Justice, pension arrangements were formally organised in 1799, starting at £2,000 a year and peaking at £3,500 in 1825.

== See also ==
- King's Bench Prison

== Bibliography ==
- Adams, George Burton (1920). "Origin of the English Courts of Common Law". Yale Law Journal. 30 (1). Yale University. ISSN 0044-0094.
- Baker, J. H. (2002). An Introduction to English Legal History. Butterworths. ISBN 0-406-93053-8.
- Bonner, George A. (1933). "The History of the Court of King's Bench". Journal of the Law Society's School of Law. 11 (1). The Law Society. OCLC 703607923.
- Boyer, Allen D. (2003). Sir Edward Coke and the Elizabethan Age. Stanford University Press. ISBN 0-8047-4809-8.
- Carter, A. T. (1910). A History of English Legal Institutions. Butterworth. OCLC 60732892.
- Hamlin, Elbert B. (1935). "The Court of Common Pleas". Connecticut Bar Journal. 9 (1). ISSN 0010-6070.
- Ibbetson, David (1984). "Sixteenth Century Contract Law: Slade's Case in Context". Oxford Journal of Legal Studies. 4 (3). Oxford University Press: 295–317. doi:10.1093/ojls/4.3.295. ISSN 0143-6503.
- Turner, Ralph V. (1977). "The Origins of Common Pleas and King's Bench". The American Journal of Legal History. 21 (3). Temple University: 238–254. doi:10.2307/844792. ISSN 0002-9319. JSTOR 844792.
- Manchester, A. H. (1980). Modern Legal History. Butterworths. ISBN 0-406-62264-7.
- Polden, Patrick (2002). "Mingling the waters: personalities, politics and the making of the Supreme Court of Judicature". Cambridge Law Journal. 61 (3). Cambridge University Press. doi:10.1017/S0008197302001745. ISSN 0008-1973. S2CID 144219482.
- Sainty, John (1993). The Judges of England 1272–1990: a list of judges of the superior courts. Oxford: Selden Society. OCLC 29670782.
- Sayles, George Osborne (1971). Select cases in the Court of King's Bench under Richard II, Henry IV and Henry V. Vol. 7. Quaritch. OCLC 60042997.
- Simpson, A. W. B. (2004). Allen D. Boyer (ed.). The Place of Slade's Case in the History of Contract. Law, Liberty and Parliament: Selected Essays on the Writings of Sir Edward Coke. Liberty Fund. ISBN 0-86597-426-8.
- Washburn, Emory (1876). "King's Bench and Growth of the Law". Stanford Law Review. 1 (1). ISSN 0038-9765.
- Wiener, Frederick Bernays (1973). "Tracing the Origins of the Court of King's Bench". ABA Journal. 59 (1). ISSN 0747-0088.
