= Custos Brevium =

Post in the English court system

The Custos Brevium was an official in the English court system: in the Court of Common Pleas and Court of King's Bench. The post was abolished by Act of Parliament in 1830.

In the Court of Common Pleas the Custos Brevium served as Chief Clerk, in charge of the officials that supported the Justices of the Common Pleas in their business. In practice the position was a royal favour, and the actual clerking was done by the Custos Brevium's Deputy.

The Custos Brevium of the King's Bench is a much more obscure figure because he was not appointed by the King. The office of Custos Brevium of the King's Bench was combined with the Clerk of the Treasury and Clerk of the Warrants by the 17th century, and there is enough evidence to suggest this had probably occurred by the middle of the 15th century.

== List of Custodes Brevium of the Court of Common Pleas ==
In the reign of Edward IV, the post was held by John Fogge.

Term as Custos Brevium	Name
23 September 1501 – 23 April 1509	Richard Decons
2 June 1506–July 1521	Richard Decons and Thomas Bonham
July 1521–18 June 1532	Thomas Bonham
24 June 1532 – 11 April 1548	John Wellysbourne
6 May 1548 – 27 January 1562	William Cecil, 1st Baron Burghley
27 January 1562 – 12 March 1591	John Lennard
2 February 1562 – 20 April 1586	Thomas Cecil
22 April 1586–1629	Thomas Spencer and Richard Spencer
c.1630	Henry Compton

On the English Restoration of 1660, the remuneration was set at £80. The post was given to William Thursby, who held it to his death in 1701. During much of the 18th century, to 1776, the custos was from the Lee family of the Earl of Lichfield, Edward Lee, 1st Earl of Lichfield having been given the post in 1700 (?). The second, third and fourth Earls occupied the position, which had been attached to the title, and which typically brought in £1000 annually.

The post was later held by Sir William Eden, 6th and 4th Baronet (1803–1873).

== List of Custodes Brevium of the Court of King/Queen's Bench ==
Term as Custos Brevium	Name
1543 – 26 April 1573	John Payne
? – 27 December 1606	Richard Payne
? – 21 December 1608	William Davison
21 December 1608 – ?	George Byng and Henry Byng
1626–1645	Robert Dewhurst and Justinian Paget

== Bibliography ==
- Baker, J.H (2003). The Oxford History of the Laws of England Volume IV. Oxford University Press. ISBN 0-19-825817-8.
- Baker, J.H (1978). The Reports of Sir John Spelman Vol. II. Selden Society.
