= Latitat =

A latitat is a legal device, namely a writ, that is "based upon the presumption that the person summoned was hiding" (see Blackstone). The word "latitat" is Latin for "he lurks".

In England, the writ is essentially a summons out of the civil, and in those days, common law–only court, King's Bench. It is now defunct, but examples still exist from 1579 and 1791. One example from the 16th century was a writ presented to the Star Chamber, a powerful court operating outside the normal system of law. In that example, the Court of King's Bench had issued a writ of latitat directing the King's Sheriff to arrest the named person and present them before the court at a specified time and place. The matter had come before the Star Chamber because the arrest had been resisted and the Under-Sheriff (a Crown official) assaulted and a writ of subpoena was now requested. The writ may have arisen in 1566 because at that time there was a "Bill for Latitat for Vexation out of the King's Bench" before Parliament, and there was another in 1802.

The current practice would be for the issue of a subpoena. If the person concerned failed to appear, the High Court of England and Wales has the power to issue a bench warrant, i.e. a warrant for the arrest of the person concerned, who may then be subject to arrest under that aegis of the Tipstaff and presentation before the court for contempt of court.
