= Roy Campling =

Australian cricketer

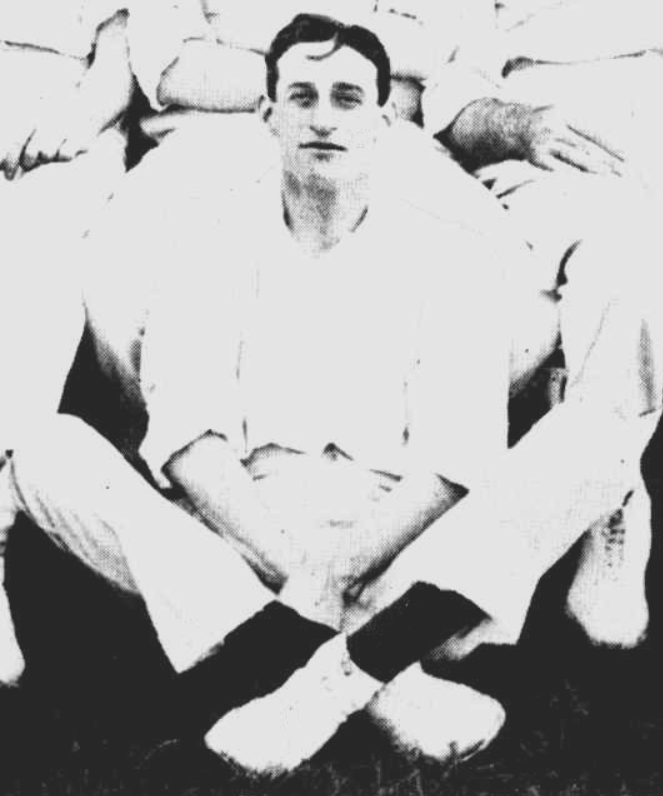

Personal information
- Born: 3 April 1892; Sydney, Australia
- Died: 21 April 1977 (aged 85); Harrington, New South Wales, Australia
- Source: ESPNcricinfo, 24 December 2016

Roy Campling (3 April 1892 – 21 April 1977) was an Australian cricketer. He played three first-class matches for New South Wales in 1922/23.

== See also ==
- List of New South Wales representative cricketers
