= Praecipe =

Writs of praecipe (imperative of the Latin praecipio ("I order"), thus meaning "order [this]") are a widespread feature of the common law tradition, generally involving the instigation of some form of swift and peremptory action.

== Early development ==
The word praecipe moved from the Roman Empire into the medieval Latin of the English Chancery, and so reached English law. In the twelfth century, writs praecipe, addressed to sheriffs, emerged as the swiftest way to bring legal disputes to the royal courts. While the so-called possessory assizes, such as novel disseisin, had marked a great advance in royal justice, they proved too rigid for the full complexities of land law, and so had to be supplemented by more specialised praecipe writs, such as praecipe for dower, or praecipe quod reddat. The latter, one of the so-called writs of entry, was singled out in Magna Carta Ch 34 by the barons in an attempt (largely unsuccessful) to delimit more firmly private from royal jurisdiction.

== North American usage ==
In law in the United States a praecipe is a document that either (A) commands a defendant to appear and show cause why an act or thing should not be done; or (B) requests the clerk of court to issue a writ and to specify its contents; though US Clerks are variously limited to handle minor precepts (typical status adjustments) in the name of the Court (i.e., a clerk cannot issue any forceful or mandamus writ). The writ was often issued to amend or change a subsequent order or to correct an error that may have been missed earlier.

In Canada, praecipe is used in place of a notice of motion as an application for a desk order that is granted in the court registry without a hearing before a judge.

== Indian usage ==
At the Bombay High Court a praecipe is used in all communications between advocates and the Court. It serves as a covering letter for the filing of documents with the registry and other registry work. Praecipes are also used in order to motion the judge, either in court or in chambers in order to place a matter for early listing or in order to seek urgent ad-interim reliefs. Praecipes in India are usually in the form of a letter addressed to the registrar of that particular court.

== See also ==
- Assize of Clarendon
- Close Roll
