= DPP v Camplin =

1978 House of Lords legal appeal

Director of Public Prosecutions v Paul Camplin
- Court: Judicial Committee of the House of Lords
- Decided: 20, 21 February and 6 April 1978
- Citation: [1978] UKHL 2; [1978] 2 WLR 679; [1978] 2 All ER 168; 67 Cr App R 14
- Transcript: DPP v Camplin [1978] UKHL 2
- Cases cited: Mancini [1942] AC 1; Holmes [1946] AC 588; Bedder [1954] l WLR 1119; as to the origins of the defence: Hayward's Case (1833) 6 C. & P. 157; as to the origins of an objective test: Welsh (1869) 11 Cox C.C.366
- Legislation cited: Homicide Act 1957 s. 3

Case history
- Prior action: 25 July 1977 appeal: [1978] QB 254; [1977] 3 WLR 929; [1978] 1 All ER 1236; 66 Cr App R 37, Court of Appeal (England and Wales)

Court membership
- Judges sitting: Lord Diplock, Lord Morris of Borth-y-Gest, Lord Simon of Glaisdale, Lord Fraser of Tullybelton, Lord Scarman

Case opinions
- Allowance of appeal against conviction (decision below) upheld - substituted sentence of manslaughter confirmed
- Dissent: none

Keywords
- Provocation

DPP v Camplin (1978) was an English criminal law appeal to the House of Lords in 1978. Its unanimous judgment helped to define the main limits of defence of provocation chiefly until Parliament replaced the defence with one of "loss of control" in the Coroners and Justice Act 2009. Its ratio decidendi (main reasoning) continues to have precedent value as the new "loss of control" defence is a renaming to avoid creep of the term into scenarios for which it was never intended, above all a blurring with diminished responsibility.

== Facts of the case ==
The defendant at trial, Camplin, was 15 years old at the time of the offence. He killed Mohammed Lal Khan by hitting him on the head with a chapati pan following Khan raping him (then referred to as buggery) and then laughing at him. (Note: No further facts can be set out. The appeals note the account given by Camplin to the police during questioning and the account given at trial differed quite substantially.)

== Decision ==
The jury weighed up the evidence and convicted Camplin of murder. He appealed contending the judge was wrong to direct the jury that age was irrelevant as to his defence of provocation. The appeal was allowed (confirming it could be relevant).

The issue at the heart of the Camplin case is whether the "reasonable man" test by numerous precedents laid out for the defence of provocation was one which matched the characteristics of the defendant or whether it ought to be confined to the characteristics of the "adult male". Lord Diplock noted that the "reasonable man" was:

an ordinary person of either sex, not exceptionally excitable or pugnacious, but possessed of such powers of self-control as everyone is entitled to expect that his fellow citizens will exercise in society as it is today

Lord Diplock noted that in the facts before the court, the age of the defendant was "a characteristic which may have its effects on temperament as well as physique". The House of Lords agreed with a previous Court of Appeal judgment which found that it was wrong for the trial judge to have instructed the jury to not consider the defendant's age (or sex) when deciding whether he had been provoked.

The judge should state what the question is using the very terms of the section. He should then explain to them that the reasonable man referred to in the question is a person having the power of self-control to be expected of an ordinary person of the sex and age of the accused, but in other respects sharing such of the accused's characteristics as they think would affect the gravity of the provocation to him; and that the question is not merely whether such a person would in like circumstances be provoked to lose his self-control but also would react to the provocation as the accused did.

== Key citations of this case ==
- Applied in R v Graham [1982] 1 All ER 801
  - Approving per curiam ratio that made relevant personal characteristics of sex and age. The same was part of this case's ratio in its final appeal namely as to duress and the duty to act reasonably if under duress.

== Footnotes and references ==
Notes
