= John Sinclair =

John Sinclair may refer to:

== Arts and entertainment ==
- John Sinklo, (a.k.a. John Sinclair, fl. 1592–1604) English actor
- John West Sinclair (1900–1945), American actor
- John Sinclair (poet) (1941–2024), American poet and activist
- John Sinclair (musician) (born 1952), British keyboardist
- John Gordon Sinclair (born 1962), Scottish actor
- Yasus Afari (John Sinclair, born 1962), Jamaican poet
- John Sinclair (German fiction), German literary character

== Law and politics ==
=== Canada ===
- John Howard Sinclair (1848–1924), Canadian politician
- John Ewen Sinclair (1879–1949), Canadian politician
- John William Sinclair (1879–?), Canadian politician in Ontario

=== United Kingdom ===
- John Sinclair, Lord Murkle (died 1755), Scottish judge
- John Sinclair (Ayr Burghs MP) (1842–1892), British politician
- John Houston Sinclair (1871–1961), British civil servant in Zanzibar
- John Sinclair (Lord Lieutenant of Caithness) (1898–1979), Scottish Lord Lieutenant

=== Elsewhere ===
- John Mitchell Sinclair (1819–1890), South Australian politician
- John Sinclair (mayor) (1827–1906), mayor of Brisbane
- John Sinclair (New Zealand politician) (1850–1940), member of the New Zealand Legislative Council
- John H. Sinclair (police officer) (born 1946), American law enforcement officer

== Nobility ==
- John Sinclair, 3rd Earl of Caithness (died 1529), Scottish noble
- John Sinclair, Master of Caithness (died 1576), Scottish noble
- John Sinclair, 23rd Lord Herdmanston (1632–1666), Scottish noble
- John Sinclair, 10th Lord Sinclair (died 1676), Scottish noble
- John Sinclair, 8th Earl of Caithness (died 1705), Scottish noble
- Sir John Sinclair, 1st Baronet (1754–1835), Scottish politician and writer
- John Sinclair, 11th Earl of Caithness (died 1789), Scottish noble
- Sir John Sinclair, 3rd Baronet (1825–1912), Scottish politician and landowner
- John Sinclair, 1st Baron Pentland (1860–1925), Scottish politician
- John Sinclair, 3rd Viscount Thurso (born 1953), Scottish politician

== Religion ==
- John Sinclair (bishop) (died 1566), Scottish Roman Catholic bishop
- John Sinclair (archdeacon of Middlesex) (1797–1875), Scottish Anglican archdeacon
- John Sinclair (archdeacon of Cirencester) (1853–1919), British Anglican clergyman

== Others ==
- John Sinclair (New Zealand carpenter) (1843–1925), New Zealand carpenter and harbourmaster
- John Sinclair (physician) (1868–1940), British physician
- John S. Sinclair (1897–1972), American lawyer and financier
- Sir John Sinclair (British Army officer) (1897–1977), British general
- John McHardy Sinclair (1933–2007), British linguist
- John Henderson Sinclair (1935–2009), British scholar and academic
- John Sinclair (environmentalist) (1939–2019), Australian environmentalist
- John Sinclair (sociologist) (born 1944), Australian sociologist
- John Sinclair (footballer) (born 1948), Australian rules footballer

== Other uses ==
- "John Sinclair", song by English musician John Lennon

== See also ==
- Jonathan Sinclair (disambiguation)
- Jack Sinclair (disambiguation)
- John St Clair (disambiguation)
