= George Fox =

English founder of Quakers (1624–1691)

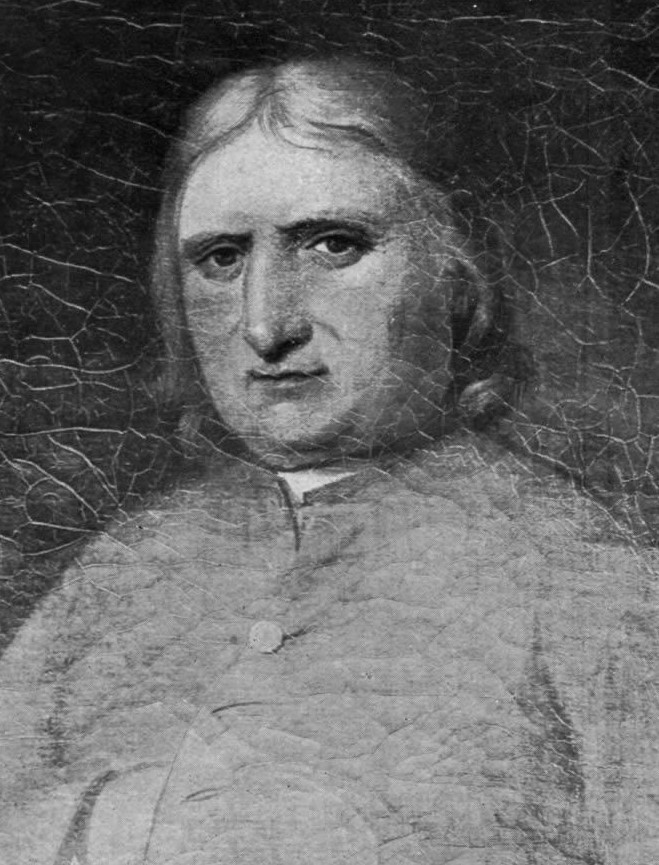
- A 17th century portrait of Fox
- Church: Religious Society of Friends (Quakers)

Personal details
- Born: July 1624 Drayton-in-the-Clay, Leicestershire, England
- Died: January 13, 1691 (aged 66) White Hart Court, Gracechurch Street, City of London, England
- Buried: Quaker Gardens, Islington
- Denomination: Church of England (Puritan) 1624-1645; Seeker 1645-7; Quaker 1647-1691
- Parents: Christopher Fox (father); Mary Lago (mother)
- Spouse: Margaret Fell (née Askew)
- Occupation: Itinerant preacher, founder and principal early leader of the Quakers
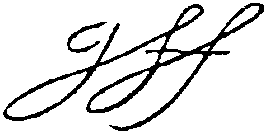
- Signature

George Fox (July 1624 O.S. (July–August 1624 N.S.) – 13 January 1691 O.S. (23 January 1692 N.S.)) was a Christian mystic and an English Dissenter, who was a founder of the Religious Society of Friends, commonly known as the Quakers or Friends. The son of a Leicestershire weaver, he lived in times of social upheaval and war. He rebelled against the religious and political authorities by proposing an unusual, uncompromising approach to the Christian faith. He travelled throughout Britain as a dissenting preacher, performed hundreds of healings, and was often persecuted by the disapproving authorities.

In 1669, he married Margaret Fell, widow of a wealthy supporter, Thomas Fell; she was a leading Friend. His ministry expanded and he made tours of North America and the Low Countries. He was arrested and jailed numerous times for his beliefs. He spent his final decade working in London to organise the expanding Quaker movement. Despite disdain from some Anglicans and Puritans, he was viewed with respect by the Quaker convert William Penn and the Lord Protector, Oliver Cromwell.

== Early years ==
=== Childhood and youth ===
==== Birth and family ====
Fox was born in July 1624 in the village of Drayton-in-the-Clay, now known as Fenny Drayton, in Leicestershire. There is no exact record of either his birthday or the date of his baptism. He was the eldest of at least six named children (the exact number is unknown) of Christopher Fox and his wife, Mary, née Lago. The names of his other siblings, extracted from scattered references in Fox's writings, were Dorothy, John (later of Polesworth), and Katherine. A further two Fox children appear on Drayton's parish baptismal record, named Mary and Sarah, probably the couple's youngest children.

Christopher Fox was a successful weaver, known to his neighbours as "Righteous Christer", probably out of scorn for his scrupulous Puritan morality. He was nevertheless respected sufficiently to be made churchwarden of Drayton by 1638, when Fox was 14 years old. Modern biographers have suggested that Fox's relationship with his father was fraught, noting his failure to record his death, that many of his references to him cast him as an enemy figure, and that he attributes to him only "a seed of God", rather than full maturity in holiness.

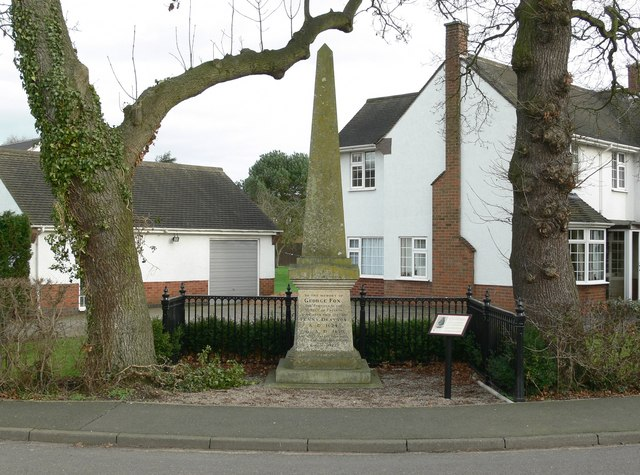
Memorial to Fox near the site of his birthplace, George Fox Lane, Fenny Drayton, Leicestershire

Fox's mother, Mary Lago, was a daughter of one of several Lago yeomen from the Drayton area, perhaps related to minor local gentry, and married beneath the social class in which she had been brought up. William Penn wrote that she was "a woman accomplished above most of her degree in the place where she lived." Fox himself described her as "an upright woman... of the stock of the martyrs," likely a reference to a family connection to either Robert Glover, burned in Coventry in 1555, or Joyce Lewis, burned in Lichfield in 1557. These forebears were executed during the Marian Persecutions for their Protestant faith. Fox's relationship with his mother was apparently far closer and he recorded an experience of deep grief on hearing of her death in 1673: "I did in verity love her as ever one could a mother; for she was a good, honest, virtuous, and a right natured woman." William Penn noted that "she was tender and indulgent over him, so that from her he met little difficulty."

William Penn would later describe Fox's parents as "honest and sufficient" people, reflecting the fact that the Fox family were unusually prosperous for their circumstances, relatively wealthy members of the emerging English middle class. They were able to provide their eldest son funds during his early religious journeys, and conceded to Nathaniel Stephens, the parish priest, that they had sent the young man away with "a great deal of gold and silver." The family's wealth is especially apparent from an incident while Fox was incarcerated in Derby Gaol in 1650, when his parents pledged £100 as bail, with additional bribes of £50. When Christopher died in the late 1650s, he left Fox a significant inheritance, which would help to support his itinerant ministry for the remainder of his life, as well as some smaller bequests to his younger siblings. Fox himself held assets in cash, loans and investments of around £700 a few years before his death, a substantial degree of personal wealth, much of it probably the residue of his inheritance.

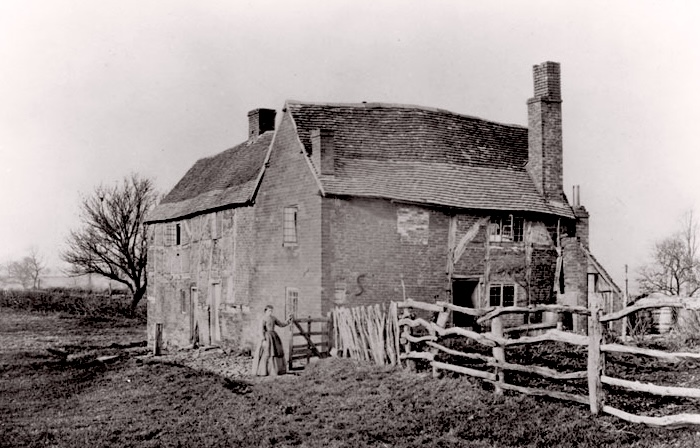
The 'Dog Yard', George Fox's presumed birthplace and childhood home in Fenny Drayton, photographed c. 1890 prior to its demolition.

His birthplace was, and remains, a small rural community, situated about 15 miles (24 km) south-west of Leicester, 10 miles (16 km) north of Coventry, and about a mile from Market Bosworth. Located just a few hundred yards off the ancient Roman road of Watling Street, the Leicestershire–Warwickshire and East–West Midlands boundary, once the border between the Danelaw and Anglo-Saxon England, and about eight miles north-west of High Cross, where Watling Street meets the Fosse Way, it lies close to the geographical centre of England. The manor and freehold of the village were held by the Purefoy family, Puritans and relatives of the regicide, William Purefoy. No buildings survive in Fenny Drayton from Fox's time with the exception of the parish church. The church contains the font in which Fox and his siblings are presumed to have been baptised and the elaborate tombs of the Purefoy squires.

There are two contrary traditions about his birthplace and childhood home, which was presumably also Christopher Fox's workplace, and its location cannot be precisely identified. The first suggests the cottage was known as the 'Dog Yard' and remained standing until the late 19th century. This house was photographed prior to its demolition and the image has been widely circulated under the title of Fox's Birthplace. The 'Dog Yard' stood on the site of the present Lodge Farm Cottages, between Fox's Covert and the Recreation Ground, also known as Adelaide's Park. Thomas Hodgkin records an American plan to transport the frame of the 'Dog Yard' to Pennsylvania for reconstruction. The plan was aborted when the uncertainty about its status as Fox's birthplace came to light. An alternative local tradition persisted which suggests Fox's home was demolished in the late 18th century, the location of which is unknown. A memorial obelisk was erected to Fox in 1872 by one of the Bracebridge family of nearby Lindley Hall. The monument is located on the corner of a bend in Old Forge Road. Since the 19th century, Fenny Drayton and its surrounding area has become a key place of pilgrimage for Quakers, commonly called '1624 Country'.

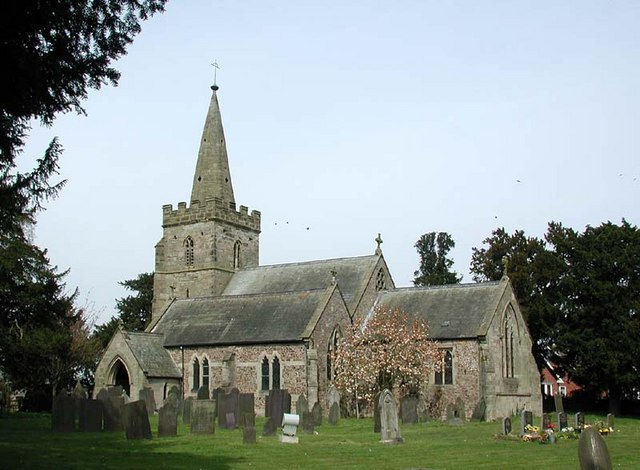
Medieval parish church of St Michael and All Angels, Fenny Drayton, where Fox was baptised and worshipped growing up.

==== Early religious influences ====
Fox's birth and upbringing fell during the early Stuart period, towards the end of the comparatively peaceful interval between the English Reformation and the English Civil War. The Reformation had transformed the once homogeneously Roman Catholic England into a society of deep religious divisions: firstly between Protestants and Roman Catholic Recusants, and secondly between various kinds of Protestant confession. Firstly, the Anglicans, those content with Elizabeth I’s religious settlement for the Church of England (a via media, or middle way, combining reformed theology and episcopal polity with Catholic traditions through the conciliatory liturgy of the Book of Common Prayer) and the subsequent reforms of Charles I and William Laud (which brought about a division in Anglicanism between Calvinist and Arminian views on volition and soteriology, and exacerbated the preexisting division between the low and high church parties). Secondly, the Puritans, who were themselves split between Presbyterians (the low church party of the established church, who sought to strengthen its Calvinist theology, restructure it into a presbyterian polity, and reform its liturgy from within the parish system) and early Congregationalists, the Separatists and the Independents (those who broke from the system of parish worship to form their own, largely Calvinist-inspired, churches). Thirdly, the radicals, especially the Baptists (those opposed to infant baptism and, like the Anglicans, divided into Arminian and Calvinist parties, the Generals and Particulars), as well as the Familists (a perfectionist mystical confession whose ideas greatly influenced the Quakers), and the Socinians (opposed to the doctrines of the Trinity and the Incarnation, the forerunners of the Unitarians). These divisions would crystallise and proliferate during the Civil War, thanks in large part to Fox's efforts. He was born roughly eight months before the accession of Charles I, whose contempt for the House of Commons, marriage to the Roman Catholic Henrietta Maria, persecution of Puritans and unpopular High Church religious policy would help spark the Civil War.

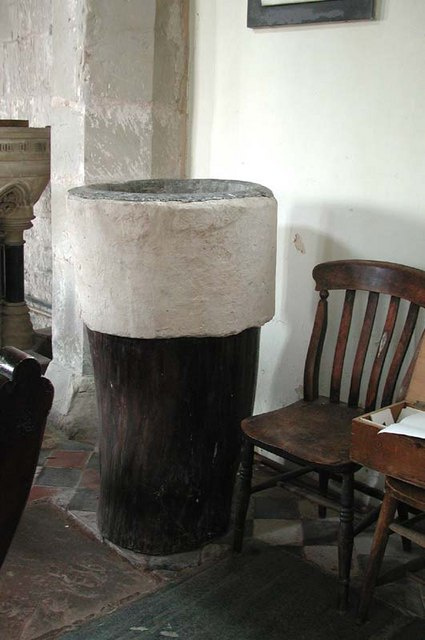
The old baptismal font in St Michael's and All Angels, Fenny Drayton. It is almost certain Fox was baptised there during the year of his birth. Objection to external water baptism, both paedobaptism and credobaptism, in favour of spiritual baptism would come to be a defining and distinctive feature of Fox's message and later Quaker theology.

In Fenny Drayton, the patronage (right to appoint clergy) of the parish church was held by the Puritan Purefoy squires. They had fostered the parish's staunch low church allegiance from Elizabethan times. Anthony Nutter, a notably radical Presbyterian, was rector between 1586 and 1605. The records of the Diocese of Lincoln show that he refused to wear vestments, kneel during services, make the sign of the cross during baptisms, or adhere to any of the vestiges of Roman Catholic ritual in Church of England liturgy. He briefly faced imprisonment in 1590 and was removed from office in 1604 for refusing to conform to James I's religious reforms following the Hampton Court Conference. Despite the relatively uncontroversial approach of his successor Robert Mason, rector from 1606 to his death in 1638 and Fox's childhood catechist, memory of Nutter's radicalism persisted in its influence on Fox's birthplace. Throughout the reigns of James and Charles I, cases of residents being excommunicated for refusing to receive Holy Communion appear in church records, notably Margaret Petty, George Heard, George Orton, George Batling, and George Smith. George Mason died in 1638 and Nathaniel Stephens replaced him as rector of Fenny Drayton when Fox was 14 years old. Stephens would come to play a prominent role in Fox's life, first as a spiritual advisor, then as a key opponent in his home district.

As to whether the religious radicalism widespread in the village influenced the religious attitude of Fox's parents, the evidence is mixed. On the one hand, his mother inherited a strong tradition of Protestant dissent within her family; Fox had an uncle, one William Pickering, active in the dissenting ministry as a Baptist preacher, and, according to his Journal, his parents practised conventional religion merely externally: "though they saw beyond the priests, yet they went to hear them." On the other hand, both of his parents seem to have opposed his abandonment of the state church and his Quaker ministry. Furthermore, Fox's father is on record as upholding the canon law of the Church of England over individual religious liberty of conscience in his role as churchwarden. George Smith's last case occurred as late as 1638, a few weeks after Nathaniel Stephens became rector of Fenny Drayton, and Christopher Fox is recorded as one of the two officials who oversaw his excommunication. The religious character of the family during Fox's early childhood was thus outwardly conformist, but touched by dissent and radicalism. A modern biographer has described the Foxes as conforming Presbyterians.

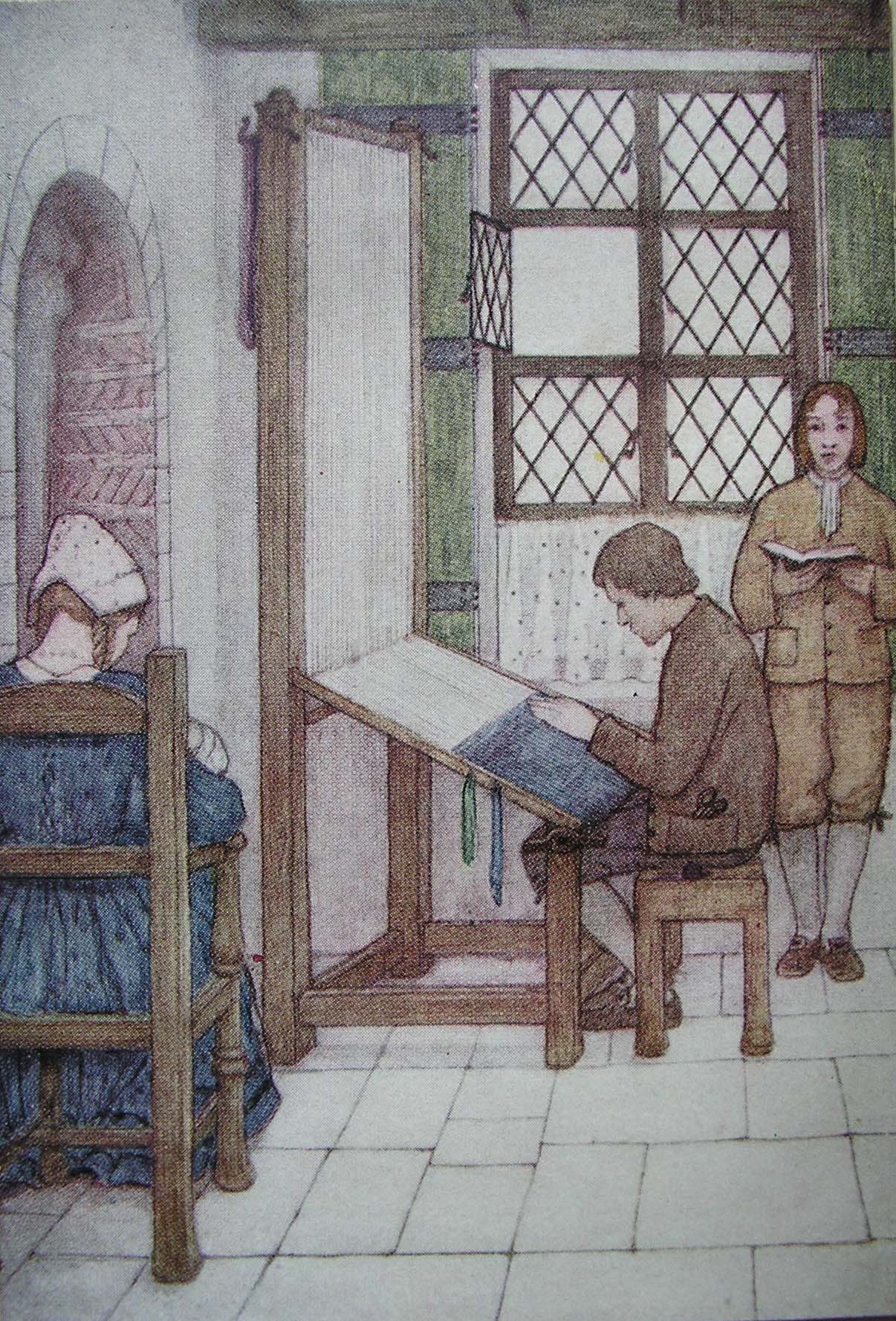
The Boyhood of George Fox by Frederick Cayley Robinson, an illustration for Lucy Violet Hodgkin's Book of Quaker Saints.

==== Education and character ====
There is no record that Fox received any formal schooling. It is widely accepted that he was taught to read, probably in the home, but whether he was taught to write in childhood is questionable. His written sentences are often confusing and disorganised, his spelling is idiosyncratic and the surviving examples of his handwriting are scrawled and heavily laboured. One modern biographer has suggested that, like many people of his age, he may have learned to write only when occasion required in later life, and is thought to have composed many of his voluminous writings with the help of an amanuensis. It is fairly clear he knew no Latin (in later life he may have learned a little Hebrew and been able to speak some Welsh and Dutch) and was uninitiated in the classical humanist learning undertaken by those of higher social standing. Like most scantily educated rural children in the early Stuart period, Fox's education and his religious formation were closely related, focused almost exclusively on knowledge of Scripture, the 1604 Book of Common Prayer, and the Anglican Catechism.

His later writings show a thoroughgoing saturation in the King James Version of the Bible, with either direct quotations or clear allusions appearing every few lines in many cases. A contemporary hyperbolically suggested that, should all copies of the Scripture be lost, Fox could reconstruct it from memory. He probably had no knowledge of philosophy, literature, science or post-biblical history. On one occasion he attempted to convince an interlocutor that the world was flat. Aside from Scripture, he seems to have expressed some interest in esoteric thought, as evidenced by an incident in 1655 when he spoke to an interlocutor “of the glory of the first body and of the Egyptian learning” (perhaps a reference to Hermeticism) “and of the language of the birds.” The Testimony of some of George Fox's Relations, appended to Thomas Ellwood's edition of the Journal speaks thus of Fox's learning: "though of no great literature, nor seeming much learned, as to the outward (being hid from the wisdom of this world), yet he had the tongue of the learned."

In his Journal, Fox stated his serious disposition from an early age and his earnest religious commitment to purity and integrity. He was a solitary child, avoiding games and other children, even describing himself as "afraid" of them. He reacted with shock and disapproval when he met morally questionable behaviour among his peers and the adults around him, an attitude arising from the Puritan sensibilities of his upbringing and, given his nickname 'Righteous Christer', probably his father's influence particularly. He had an especial horror of religious hypocrites, characterising them in his Journal as "professors" - outwardly practising members of the church who showed no signs of spiritual and moral conversion. Modern biographers have described Fox's early character as shy, socially awkward, idealistic and judgemental: "something of a prig" and "one who loved men in the aggregate but who strongly disapproved of them as individuals."

==== Apprenticeship and Atherstone incident ====
As he grew up, Fox's relatives "thought to have made me a priest", but the plan was not pursued. Fox does not record the reason for this, but modern authors have suggested either a lack of funds or the marginalisation of Puritans in the Church of England by Charles I and William Laud. It has been speculated that, had Fox attempted to study for Holy Orders, he may have been thrown out of university for his heterodoxy. He was instead apprenticed to a local cordwainer and grazier, George Gee of nearby Mancetter on an unrecorded date, probably sometime after his 11th birthday. He apparently learned more than merely husbandry and shoemaking, since Gee's enterprise required him to develop accounting and administrative skills as well. Of his role as shepherd, William Penn noted after his death that "he took most delight in sheep... an employment that very well suited his mind in several respects, both for its innocency and solitude; and was a just figure of his after ministry and service." During his early ministry, Fox sometimes supplemented his travelling expenses with the earnings from cobbling. One of his detractors referred to him by this profession: "a poor journeyman cordwainer" who "could not live from his trade."

In the early summer of 1643, the 18-year-old Fox reached what William C. Braithwaite called the "hour of decision," after an incident at a fair in Atherstone, a market town about three miles from Fenny Drayton. Fox was sitting and drinking with other young men – his cousin and their friend, both professing Puritans – who demanded that he pay their bill if he declined to join them in drinking games. Disgusted, he paid the bill but refused to participate and left their company. This incident marked the onset of a prolonged spiritual, and likely mental health, crisis that would lead him to abandon his apprenticeship. It would last until around 1647–8, was accompanied by a sense of vocation to solitude and itinerancy, and played out against the backdrop of the First English Civil War (1642–1646).

The war was initially concentrated in the Midland counties where Fox lived. It had started in August 1642 when Charles I raised his standard at Nottingham, around 50 miles north of Fenny Drayton. Charles had then besieged Coventry later that month, and the first major battle of the conflict had been fought the following October at Edgehill, around 30 miles south. The war would continue until 1646, before briefly breaking out again in 1648.

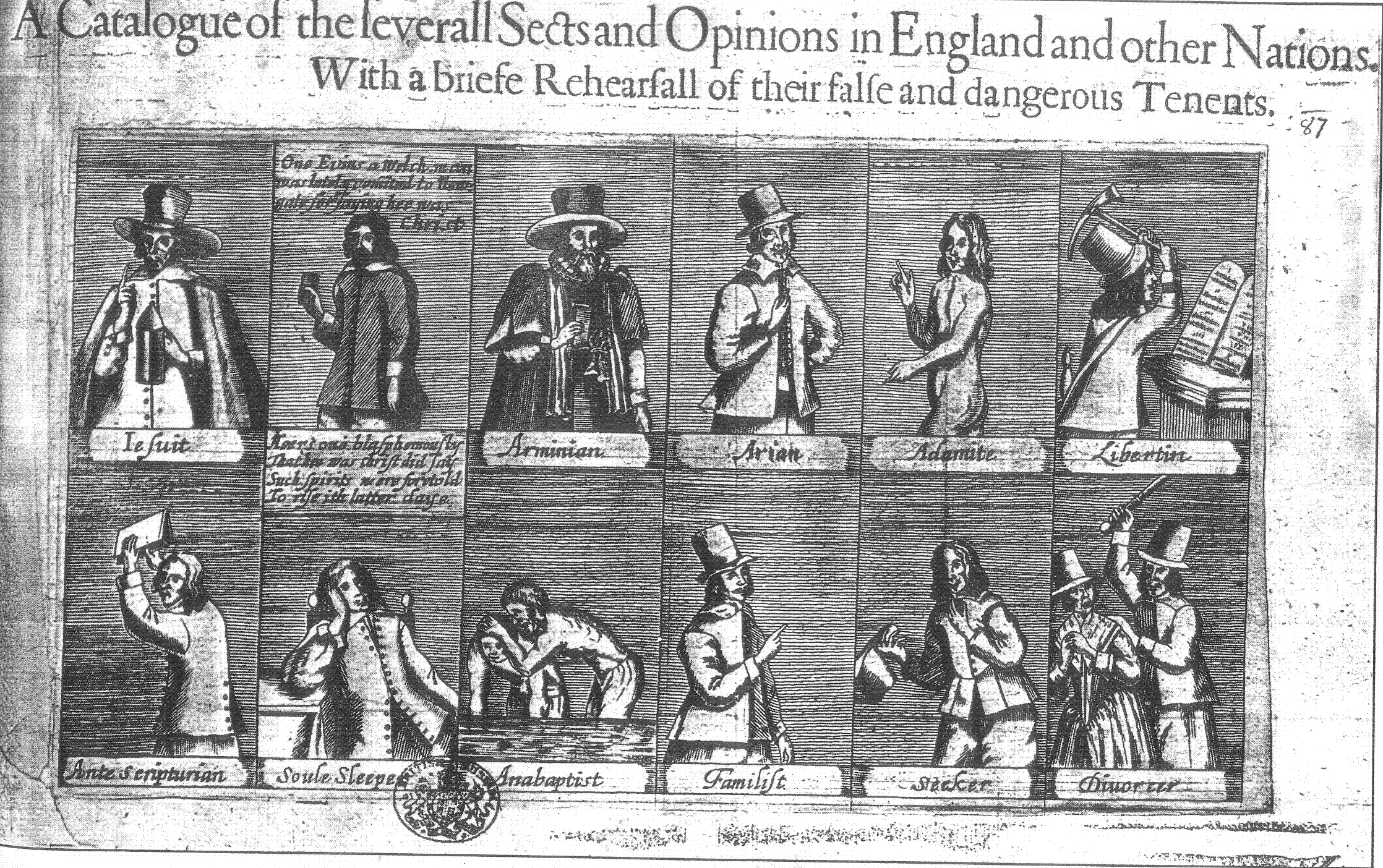
A Catalogue of the Severall Sects and Opinions in England and other Nations, a London broadsheet denouncing English dissenters printed in 1647, a few years after Fox first visited London and in the inaugural year of his preaching mission. It depicts, among others, a Roman Catholic Jesuit, an Arminian, an Arian (probably a Socinian), a nudist Adamite, a Soul Sleeper, an Anabaptist performing credobaptism, a Familist, and one of the Seekers (Fox's own ill-defined group in his early years).

=== Spiritual crisis and first journey ===
In September 1643 Fox "left my relations, and broke off all familiarity or fellowship with young or old", setting out on a journey down Watling Street that ended in London, as his crisis progressed. The exact nature of his difficulties is unclear, described in the Journal by terms such as "sorrow," "exercises," "great darkness," "trouble of mind," "tempted to sin" and "tempted to despair" (that is, give up hope of salvation). Subsequent biographers have characterised it as depression, a personal symptom of the wider unsettling of traditional certainties brought on by the Civil War, avoidance of conscription to the Roundhead army or an attack on his village, and, given Fox had abandoned his apprenticeship and would come to renounce both the Church of England and his parents' Calvinist theology, a conventional adolescent rebellion. Modern scholars have also speculated that adolescent sexual development played a part in Fox's struggle. As Fox himself stated in an unpublished letter of the 1650s, "I have drunk the cup of fornication". It has been suggested his first journey was the occasion of that confessed loss of virginity. His crisis was also a time of religious experimentation for Fox, coinciding with the widespread religious experimentation afoot in the nation. He sought counsel from many clergy, both Puritans in the established church and members of the new dissenting groups. Their failure to "speak to my condition" initiated his rejection of almost all outward forms of religion, and a determination to know all religious truth only "by experiment."

His journey progressed slowly at first, and he spent time living near to Drayton, in Lutterworth (the former home and burial place of the Lollard leader John Wycliffe) and in Northampton. Later he travelled south from Northampton, staying awhile at Newport Pagnell, before arriving at Barnet in June, 1644. He passed through predominantly parliamentarian regions, however, both Roundhead and Cavalier troops were stationed in the villages and towns along his route. While at Barnet, Fox was torn by depression and perhaps physical urges (Barnet was a rural resort for London and staging post of the Parliamentarian Army, noted for its prostitutes during the Civil War). He alternately shut himself in his room for days at a time or went out alone into the countryside. He was about 20 years old at this time.

==== First visit to London ====
Still afflicted by melancholy, Fox left Barnet for the City of London in late summer 1644, securing lodgings and renewing acquaintance with his uncle, William (or Edward) Pickering, a Baptist minister. Fox's first visit to London coincided closely with important developments among both the conformist Puritans and the Independents and radicals – perhaps referred to obliquely by his line in the Journal, "I looked upon the great professors of the city of London". He noted that many in his uncle's nascent Baptist movement were, as he put it, "still tender" (i.e. not hidebound by Calvinist doctrine and still open to personal religious experience). Nevertheless, it was in October 1644, almost certainly while Fox was in the city, that seven London Baptist congregations issued the First London Baptist Confession, a firmly Particular or Calvinist statement of faith. This was a response to the official Westminster Assembly of Puritan divines, meeting just up the River Thames, in the Jerusalem Chamber at Westminster Abbey, on the orders of the Long Parliament. This group was responsible for drafting the constitutional documents for a never realised state Presbyterian Church of England, the Westminster Confession and the Directory of Public Worship, both of which were published in 1644. Fox's depression continued during his time in London, while his disaffection from both mainstream and the radical Baptists increased.

==== Return to the Midlands ====
After nearly a year of travelling, Fox returned to his family in Drayton, probably in 1645, his spiritual despondency still unresolved. He had received word in London that his parents were worried for his safety amid the Civil War, returning around the time of the brutal Siege and Sack of Leicester (31 May 1645), the county town of his native Leicestershire, and the conclusive Parliamentary victory at the Battle of Naseby (14 June 1645), in neighbouring Northamptonshire. His family urged him to marry, while others advised him to enlist with the Roundheads. Dissatisfied with either prospect, he instead spent a short period lodging with a Puritan cleric in Coventry, about 10 miles south of Drayton. Coventry was then a leading centre of Calvinism, considered a "second Geneva", and Fox must have witnessed at first hand the impact of the Presbyterian revolution that was reshaping religious life in most Parliamentarian towns across England. In spite of the city's staunch Calvinism, he mentions encounters with many "tender people" (i.e. those open to religious experience) in Coventry. After a few months, he returned to reside at Drayton for around one more year. During this time his spiritual despair deepened. The Journal speaks of deep melancholy, long bouts of solitary nocturnal walking, and a frantic search for advice. Nathaniel Stephens, Fox's parish priest since his early teens, a Calvinist Presbyterian and an academic theologian in the scholastic tradition, at first did his best to minister to him with kindness, and they often visited one another. Stephens considered Fox a gifted young man, but the two disagreed on many issues, and he later called Fox mad and spoke against him.

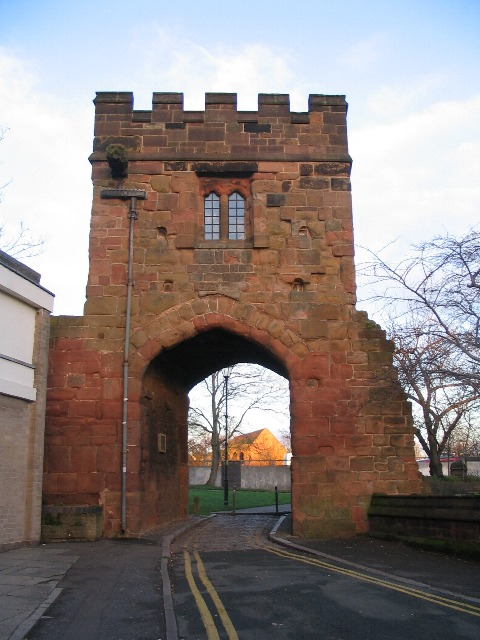
Cook Street Gate today. One of the twelve gates in Coventry town walls where Fox received the first of his three initial "openings", his term for a vision or revelation.

After despairing of Stephens's advice, he sought the counsel of a spate of local clergymen around the Leicestershire–Warwickshire border. The "ancient" vicar of Mancetter, Richard Able, told him to take tobacco (which Fox disliked) and sing the psalms (he couldn't sing). Able soon tired of him, grew annoyed, and gossiped to his flock about what he had said. Another clergyman in Tamworth struck him as foolish. A third, Dr Cradock of Coventry, lost his temper when Fox accidentally stepped on a flower bed in his garden. A fourth, John Machin of Atherstone, recommended bloodletting, which, when attempted, drew no blood. As each clerical counsellor disappointed him, Fox's condition grew worse. His Puritan asceticism intensified during this period, and in 1645 he abandoned the celebration of Christmas to devote himself to missions of poverty relief. He also refused to attend wedding celebrations, sending only a present of relief money to poor couples.

Fox's experience of dissenters in this formative period was more mixed than that of the clerics of the established church. He expressed admiration for the “tenderness” of many, particularly Baptists and mystics, and horror at others, specifically at Calvinist rigidity, an overemphasis on “sin and imperfection”, and at blatant scriptural unorthodoxy, notably from those who denied that women had immortal souls. In spite of occasional sympathies, however, he resolutely refused to join any of the existing dissenting groups.

==== Initial "openings" and break with the Established Church ====
Fox's crisis of confidence came to a head in spring 1646 with his first revelations, or "openings" to use his term. They led him to reject all conventional religious activity (except Scripture reading), thus entering into schism with the Church of England. The step is presented in the Journal as three visions, revelations, realisations, or "openings":

1. That discipleship without spiritual baptism and personal sanctification is false. Apparently received while walking up to a gate, perhaps the surviving Swanswell or Cook Street Gates, in Coventry's city walls.
2. On the superfluity of stipended clerical ministry. Poignantly received while walking in the fields on a Sunday morning.
3. On the superfluity of sacred buildings, which thereafter he began to call "steeple-houses".

Though central to his later message, these were symptoms of a broader conviction forming around 1646: that God is directly accessible without a mediator, expressed in one of Fox's best-loved and most quoted passages:

As I had forsaken the priests, so I left the separate preachers also... And when all my hopes in them and in all men were gone, so that I had nothing outwardly to help me, nor could tell what to do, then, oh, then, I heard a voice which said, "There is one, even Christ Jesus, that can speak to thy condition"; and when I heard it my heart did leap for joy... And this I knew experimentally.

Both Fox's family and Nathaniel Stephens were alarmed by his refusal to attend church, which followed shortly after, and it occasioned considerable objection from both. In response he cited the First Epistle of John (2:27): "The anointing which ye have received of him abideth in you, and ye need not that any man teach you."

Fox resolved to accept no spiritual truth not taught to him personally and "experimentally" (experientially) in prayer, developing an alternative habit of worship in solitary silence while reading and meditating on Scripture. The Journal describes this charmingly in the following terms: "I would go into the orchard or the fields, with my Bible, by myself... in hollow trees and lonesome places till night came on; and frequently in the night walked about." This interior prayer and reflection led to gradual spiritual breakthroughs and the formulation of his distinctive, mystical understanding of Christianity. A period marked by joyful “openings” and ongoing sorrow followed, during which he resumed his travels around the beginning of 1647 and gradually began to preach his ideas.

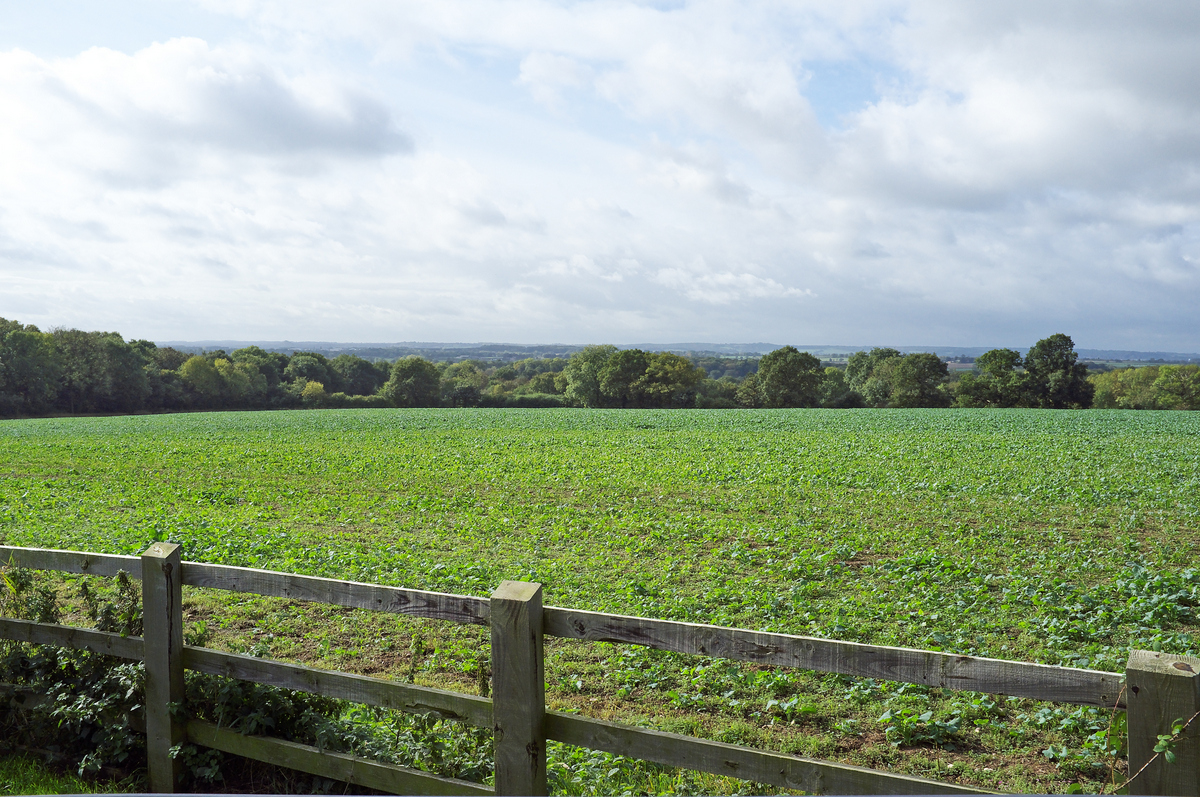
Bosworth Field viewed from Ambion Hill, the site of the Battle of Bosworth about 5 miles from Fenny Drayton. Thomas Hodgkin surmised that Fox must have frequently wandered over this spot in prayer.

Fox's personal rejection of clerical authority coincided with a complete collapse of order in the Church of England. By the execution of William Laud, Archbishop of Canterbury, in January 1645, the authority of the bishops had effectively disintegrated. Later that year, in October, the Long Parliament passed the Ordinance Abolishing Archbishops and Bishops, formally removing the episcopal structure from the Church. Following Pride's Purge in 1648, the Puritans' longstanding hope for Presbyterian reformation based on the Westminster Assembly's proposals was foiled. By September 1650, Parliament repealed the Act of Uniformity, making Sunday attendance at parish churches optional. This both recognised the existing sects and encouraged a host of new ones, including Fox's Quakers.

== Religious Society of Friends ==
In 1647 Fox began to preach publicly: in market-places, fields, appointed meetings of various kinds or even sometimes in "steeple-houses" (churches) after the service. Fox said in his journal ‘and as I was walking by the steeplehouse side, in the town of Mansfield the Lord said unto me, that which people do trample upon must be thy food. And as the Lord spoke he opened it to me how that people and professors did trample upon the life, even the life of Christ was trampled upon…’ Mansfield in Nottinghamshire was a town to which George Fox lived. The steeplehouse in Mansfield was the church of St Peter and St Paul.

His powerful preaching began to attract a small following. It is not clear at what point the Society of Friends was formed, but there was certainly a group of people who often travelled together. At first, they called themselves "Children of the Light" or "Friends of the Truth", and later simply "Friends". Fox seems initially to have had no desire to found a sect, but only to proclaim what he saw as the pure and genuine principles of Christianity in their original simplicity, though he afterward showed great prowess as a religious organiser in the structure he gave to the new society.

There were a great many rival Christian denominations holding very diverse opinions in that period; the atmosphere of dispute and confusion gave Fox an opportunity to put forward his own beliefs through his personal sermons. Fox's preaching was grounded in scripture but was mainly effective because of the intense personal experience he was able to project. He was scathing about immorality, deceit and the exacting of tithes and urged his listeners to lead lives without sin, avoiding the Ranters' antinomian view that a believer becomes automatically sinless. By 1651 he had gathered other talented preachers around him and continued to roam the country despite a harsh reception from some listeners, who would whip and beat them to drive them away. As his reputation spread, his words were not welcomed by all. As an uncompromising preacher, he hurled disputation and contradiction to the faces of his opponents. The worship of Friends in the form of silent waiting punctuated by individuals speaking as the Spirit moved them seems to have been well-established by this time, though it is not recorded how this came to be; Richard Bauman asserts that "speaking was an important feature of the meeting for worship from the earliest days of Quakerism."

=== Imprisonment ===
Fox complained to judges about decisions he considered morally wrong, as he did in a letter on the case of a woman due to be executed for theft. He campaigned against paying the tithes intended to fund the established church, which often went into the pockets of absentee landlords or religious colleges distant from the paying parishioners. In his view, as God was everywhere and anyone could preach, the established church was unnecessary and a university qualification irrelevant for a preacher. Conflict with civil authority was inevitable. Fox was imprisoned several times, the first at Nottingham in 1649. At Derby in 1650 he was imprisoned for blasphemy; a judge mocked Fox's exhortation to "tremble at the word of the Lord", calling him and his followers "Quakers". After he refused to fight against the return of the monarchy (or to take up arms for any reason), his sentence was doubled. The refusal to swear oaths or take up arms came to be much more important in his public statements. Refusal to take oaths meant that Quakers could be prosecuted under laws compelling subjects to pledge allegiance and made testifying in court problematic. In a letter of 1652 (That which is set up by the sword), he urged Friends not to use "carnal weapons" but "spiritual weapons", saying, "let the waves [the power of nations] break over your heads".

In 1652, Fox preached for several hours under a walnut tree at Balby, where his disciple Thomas Aldham was instrumental in setting up the first meeting in the Doncaster area. In the same year Fox felt that God led him to ascend Pendle Hill, where he had a vision of many souls coming to Christ. From there he travelled to Sedbergh, where he had heard a group of Seekers was meeting, and preached to over a thousand people on Firbank Fell, convincing many, including Francis Howgill, to accept that Christ might speak to people directly. At the end of the month he stayed at Swarthmoor Hall, near Ulverston, the home of Thomas Fell, vice-chancellor of the Duchy of Lancaster, and his wife, Margaret. Around that time, the ad hoc meetings of Friends began to be formalised and a monthly meeting was set up in County Durham. Margaret became a Quaker, and although Thomas did not convert, his familiarity with the Friends proved influential when Fox was arrested for blasphemy in October. Fell was one of three presiding judges, and the charges were dismissed on a technicality.

Fox remained at Swarthmoor until the summer of 1653, then left for Carlisle, where he was arrested again for blasphemy. It was even proposed to put him to death, but Parliament requested his release rather than have "a young man ... die for religion". Further imprisonments came in London in 1654, Launceston in 1656, Lancaster in 1660, Leicester in 1662, Lancaster again and Scarborough in 1664–1666 and Worcester in 1673–1675. Charges usually included causing a disturbance and travelling without a pass. Quakers fell foul of irregularly enforced laws forbidding unauthorised worship, while actions motivated by belief in social equality – refusing to use or acknowledge titles, take hats off in court or bow to those who considered themselves socially superior – were seen as disrespectful. While imprisoned at Launceston, Fox wrote, "Christ our Lord and master saith 'Swear not at all, but let your communications be yea, yea, and nay, nay, for whatsoever is more than these cometh of evil.' ... the Apostle James saith, 'My brethren, above all things swear not, neither by heaven, nor by earth, nor by any other oath. Lest ye fall into condemnation.'"

In prison George Fox continued writing and preaching, feeling that imprisonment brought him into contact with people who needed his help—the jailers as well as his fellow prisoners. In his journal, he told his magistrate, "God dwells not in temples made with hands." He also sought to set an example by his actions there, turning the other cheek when being beaten and refusing to show his captors any dejected feelings.

=== Encounters with Cromwell ===
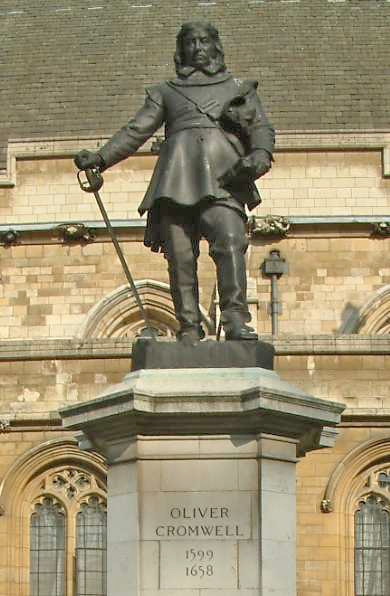
Cromwell was sympathetic to Fox and almost agreed to follow his teaching—but persecution of Quakers continued.

Parliamentarians grew suspicious of monarchist plots and fearful that the group travelling with Fox aimed to overthrow the government: by this time his meetings were regularly attracting crowds of over a thousand. In early 1655 he was arrested at Whetstone, Leicestershire and taken to London under armed guard. In March he was brought before the Lord Protector, Oliver Cromwell. After affirming that he had no intention of taking up arms, Fox was able to speak to Cromwell for most of the morning about the Friends. He advised him to listen to God's voice and obey it, so that as Fox left, Cromwell "with tears in his eyes said, 'Come again to my house; for if thou and I were but an hour of a day together, we should be nearer one to the other'; adding that he wished [Fox] no more ill than he did to his own soul."

This episode was later recalled as an example of "speaking truth to power", a preaching technique by which subsequent Quakers hoped to influence the powerful. Although not used until the 20th century, the phrase is related to the ideas of plain speech and simplicity which Fox practised, but motivated by the more worldly goal of eradicating war, injustice and oppression.

Fox petitioned Cromwell over the course of 1656 to alleviate the persecution of Quakers. Later that year, they met for a second time at Whitehall. On a personal level, the meeting went well; despite disagreements between the two men, they had a certain rapport. Fox invited Cromwell to "lay down his crown at the feet of Jesus" – which Cromwell declined to do. Fox met Cromwell again twice in March 1657. Their last meeting was in 1658 at Hampton Court, though they could not speak for long or meet again because of the Protector's worsening illness – Fox even wrote that "he looked like a dead man". Cromwell died in September of that year.

=== James Nayler ===
One early Quaker convert, the Yorkshireman James Nayler, arose as a prominent preacher in London around 1655. A breach began to form between Fox's and Nayler's followers. As Fox was held prisoner at Launceston, Nayler moved south-westwards towards Launceston intending to meet Fox and heal any rift. On the way he was arrested himself and held at Exeter. After Fox was released from Launceston gaol in 1656, he preached throughout the West Country. Arriving at Exeter late in September, Fox was reunited with Nayler. Nayler and his followers refused to remove their hats while Fox prayed, which Fox took as both a personal slight and a bad example. When Nayler refused to kiss Fox's hand, Fox told Nayler to kiss his foot instead. Nayler was offended and the two parted acrimoniously. Fox wrote that "there was now a wicked spirit risen amongst Friends".

After Nayler's own release later the same year he rode into Bristol triumphantly playing the part of Jesus Christ in a re-enactment of Palm Sunday. He was arrested and taken to London, where Parliament defeated a motion to execute him by a vote of 96–82. Instead, they ordered that he be pilloried and whipped through both London and Bristol, branded on his forehead with the letter B (for blasphemer), bored through the tongue with a red-hot iron and imprisoned in solitary confinement with hard labour. Nayler was released in 1659, but he was a broken man. On meeting Fox in London, he fell to his knees and begged Fox's forgiveness. Shortly afterward, Nayler was attacked by thieves while travelling home to his family, and died.

== Suffering and growth ==
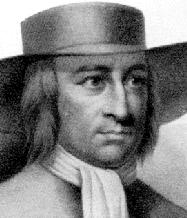
19th-century engraving of George Fox, based on a painting of unknown date

The persecutions of these years – with about a thousand Friends in prison by 1657 – hardened Fox's opinions of traditional religious and social practices. In his preaching, he often emphasised the Quaker rejection of baptism by water; this was a useful way of highlighting how the focus of Friends on inward transformation differed from what he saw as the superstition of outward ritual. It was also a deliberate provocation of adherents of those practices, so providing opportunities for Fox to argue with them on matters of scripture. The same pattern appeared in his court appearances: when a judge challenged him to remove his hat, Fox replied by asking where in the Bible such an injunction could be found.

The Society of Friends became increasingly organised towards the end of the decade. Large meetings were held, including a three-day event in Bedfordshire, the precursor of the present Britain Yearly Meeting system. Fox commissioned two Friends to travel around the country collecting the testimonies of imprisoned Quakers, as evidence of their persecution; this led to the establishment in 1675 of Meeting for Sufferings, which continued until 2026.

The 1650s, when the Friends were at their most confrontational, was one of the most creative periods of their history. Under the Commonwealth, Fox had hoped that the movement would become the major church in England. Disagreements, persecution and increasing social turmoil, however, led Fox to suffer from severe depression, which left him deeply troubled at Reading, Berkshire, for ten weeks in 1658 or 1659. In 1659, he sent parliament his most politically radical pamphlet, Fifty nine Particulars laid down for the Regulating things, but the year was so chaotic that it never considered these; the document was not reprinted until the 21st century.

=== The Restoration ===
With the restoration of the monarchy, Fox's dreams of establishing the Friends as the dominant religion seemed at an end. He was again accused of conspiracy, this time against Charles II, and fanaticism – a charge he resented. He was imprisoned in Lancaster for five months, during which he wrote to the king offering advice on governance: Charles should refrain from war and domestic religious persecution, and discourage oath-taking, plays, and maypole games. These last suggestions reveal Fox's Puritan leanings, which continued to influence Quakers for centuries after his death. Once again, Fox was released after demonstrating that he had no military ambitions.

At least on one point, Charles listened to Fox. The 700 Quakers who had been imprisoned under Richard Cromwell were released, though the government remained uncertain about the group's links with other, more violent, movements. A revolt by the Fifth Monarchists in January 1661 led to the suppression of that sect and the repression of other Nonconformists, including Quakers. In the aftermath of this attempted coup, Fox and eleven other Quakers issued a broadside proclaiming what became known among Friends in the 20th century as the "peace testimony", committing themselves to oppose all outward wars and strife as contrary to the will of God. Not all his followers accepted this commitment; Isaac Penington, for example, dissented for a time, arguing that the state had a duty to protect the innocent from evil, if necessary by using military force. Despite the testimony, persecution against Quakers and other dissenters continued.

Penington and others such as John Perrot and John Pennyman were uneasy at Fox's increasing power within the movement. Like Nayler before them, they saw no reason why men should remove their hats for prayer, arguing that men and women should be treated as equals, and if, as according to the apostle Paul, women should cover their heads, then so could men. Perrot and Penington lost the argument. Perrot emigrated to the New World, and Fox retained leadership of the movement.

Parliament enacted laws which forbade non-Anglican religious meetings of more than five people, essentially making Quaker meetings illegal. Fox counselled his followers to violate openly laws that attempted to suppress the movement, and many Friends, including women and children, were jailed over the next quarter-century. Meanwhile, Quakers in New England had been banished (and some executed), and Charles was advised by his councillors to issue a mandamus condemning this practice and allowing them to return. Fox was able to meet some of the New England Friends when they came to London, stimulating his interest in the colonies. Fox was unable to travel there immediately: he was imprisoned again in 1664 for his refusal to swear the oath of allegiance, and on his release in 1666 was preoccupied with organizational matters – he normalised the system of monthly and quarterly meetings throughout the country, and extended it to Ireland.

Visiting Ireland also gave him the opportunity to preach against what he regarded as the excesses of the Roman Catholic Church, particularly the use of ritual. More recent Quaker commentators have noted points of contact between the two traditions: both claim the actual presence of God in their meetings, and both allow the collective discernment of the church to inform the interpretation of biblical teaching. Fox, however, did not acknowledge such similarities, reflecting the strongly anti-Catholic outlook common among many English Protestants of his time.

Fox married Margaret Fell of Swarthmoor Hall, a lady of high social position and one of his early converts, on 27 October 1669 at a meeting in Bristol. She was ten years his senior and had eight children (all but one of them Quakers) by her first husband, Thomas Fell, who had died in 1658. She was herself very active in the movement, and had campaigned for equality and the acceptance of women as preachers. As there were no priests at Quaker weddings to perform the ceremony, the union took the form of a civil marriage approved by the principals and the witnesses at a meeting. Ten days after the marriage, Margaret returned to Swarthmoor to continue her work there, while George went back to London. Their shared religious work was at the heart of their life together, and they later collaborated on much of the administration the Society required. Shortly after the marriage, Margaret was imprisoned in Lancaster; George remained in the south-east of England, becoming so ill and depressed that for a time he lost his sight.

=== Travels in North America and Europe ===
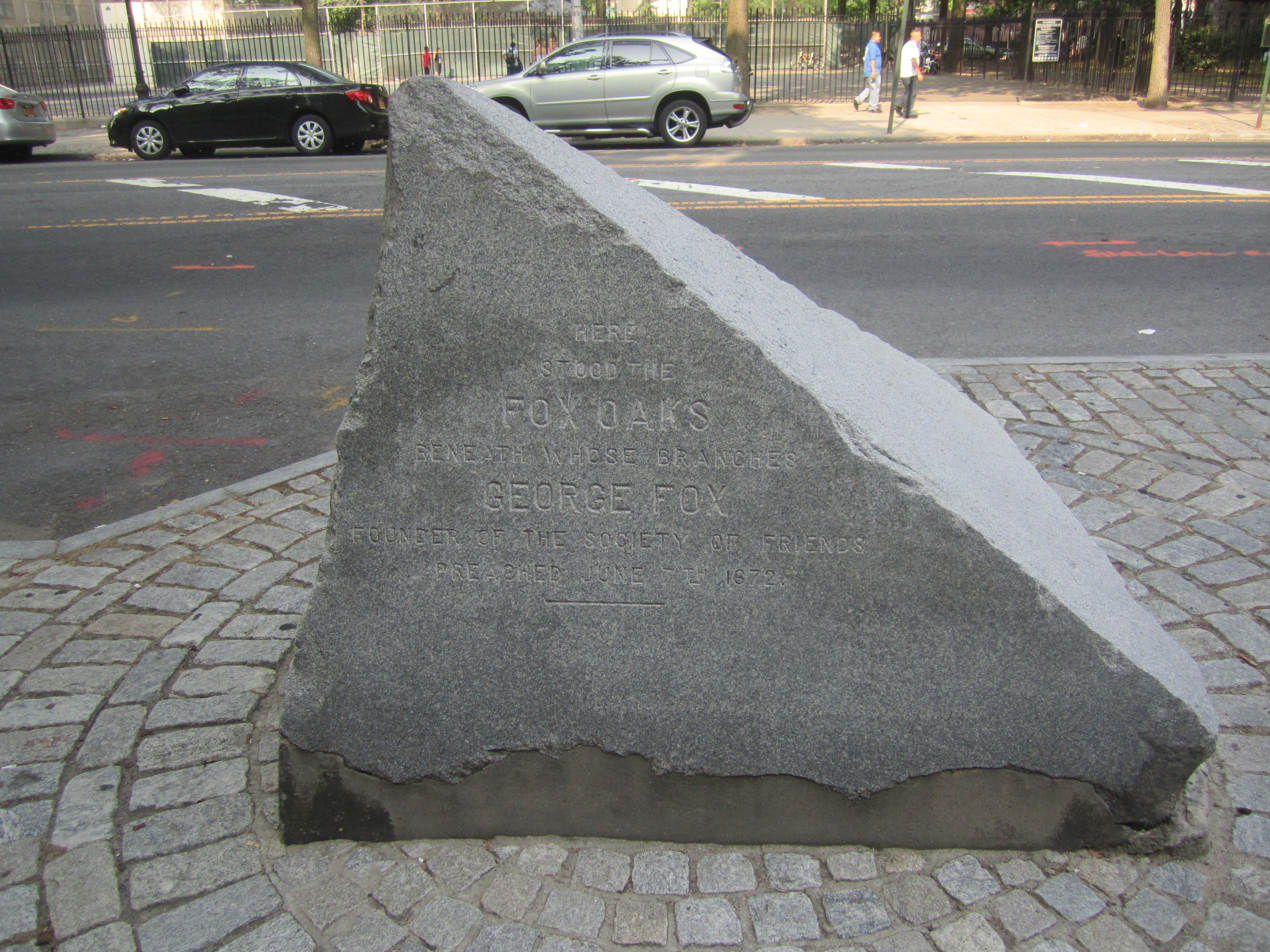
This stone in Flushing, New York, located across from the John Bowne House commemorates the place where George Fox preached a sermon on 7 June 1672.

By 1671 Fox had recovered and Margaret had been released by order of the King. Fox resolved to visit the English settlements in North America and the West Indies, remaining there for two years, possibly to counter any remnants of Perrot's teaching there. After a voyage of seven weeks, during which dolphins were caught and eaten, the party arrived in Barbados on 3 October 1671. From there, Fox sent an epistle to Friends spelling out the role of women's meetings in the Quaker marriage ceremony, a point of controversy when he returned home. One of his proposals suggested that the prospective couple should be interviewed by an all-female meeting prior to the marriage to determine whether there were any financial or other impediments. Though women's meetings had been held in London for the last ten years, this was an innovation in Bristol and the north-west of England, which many there felt went too far.

Fox wrote a letter to the governor and assembly of the island in which he refuted charges that Quakers were stirring up the slaves to revolt and tried to affirm the orthodoxy of Quaker beliefs. After a stay in Jamaica, Fox's first landfall on the North American continent was at Maryland, where he participated in a four-day meeting of local Quakers. He remained there while various of his English companions travelled to the other colonies, because he wished to meet some Native Americans who were interested in Quaker ways—though he relates that they had "a great dispute" among themselves about whether to participate in the meeting. Fox was impressed by their general demeanour, which he saw as "courteous and loving". He resented the suggestion (from a man in North Carolina) that "the Light and Spirit of God ... was not in the Indians", a proposition which Fox rejected. Fox left no record of encountering slaves on the mainland.

Elsewhere in the colonies, Fox helped to establish organizational systems for the Friends, along the same lines as he had done in Britain. He also preached to many non-Quakers, some but not all of whom were converted.

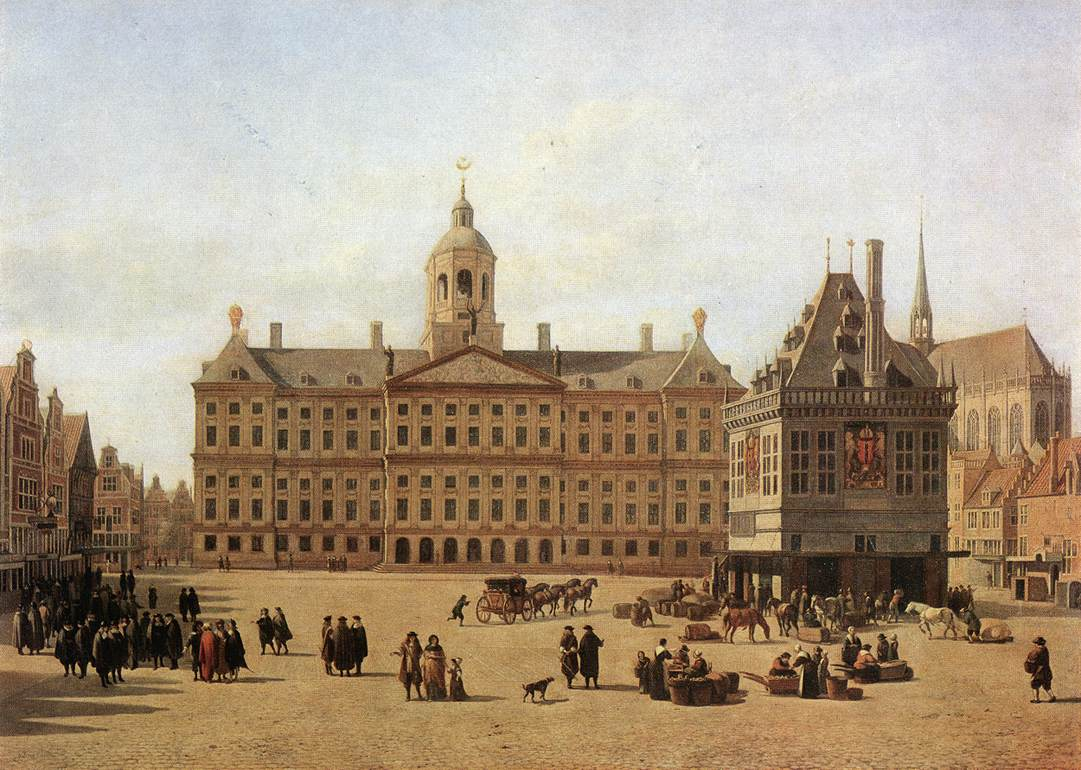
Fox established a Yearly Meeting in Amsterdam for Friends in the Netherlands and German states.

After extensive travels round the various American colonies, George Fox returned to England in June 1673 confident that his movement was firmly established there. Back in England, however, he found his movement sharply divided among provincial Friends (such as William Rogers, John Wilkinson and John Story) who resisted establishment of women's meetings and the power of those who resided in or near London. With William Penn and Robert Barclay as allies of Fox, the challenge to Fox's leadership was eventually put down. But in the midst of the dispute, Fox was imprisoned again for refusing to swear oaths after being captured at Armscote, Worcestershire. His mother died shortly after hearing of his arrest and Fox's health began to suffer. Margaret Fell petitioned the king for his release, which was granted, but Fox felt too weak to take up his travels immediately. Recuperating at Swarthmoor, he began dictating what would be published after his death as his journal and devoted his time to his written output: letters, both public and private, as well as books and essays. Much of his energy was devoted to the topic of oaths, having become convinced of its importance to Quaker ideas. By refusing to swear, he felt that he could bear witness to the value of truth in everyday life, as well as to God, whom he associated with truth and the inner light.

For three months in 1677 and a month in 1684, Fox visited the Friends in the Netherlands, and organised their meetings for discipline. The first trip was the more extensive, taking him into what is now Germany, proceeding along the coast to Friedrichstadt and back again over several days. Meanwhile, Fox was participating in a dispute among Friends in Britain over the role of women in meetings, a struggle which took much of his energy and left him exhausted. Returning to England, he stayed in the south to try to end the dispute. He followed with interest the foundation of the colony of Pennsylvania, where Penn had given him over 1,000 acres (4.0 km^{2}) of land. Persecution continued, with Fox arrested briefly in October 1683. Fox's health was worsening, but he continued his activities – writing to leaders in Poland, Denmark, Germany and elsewhere about his beliefs and their treatment of Quakers.

== Last years ==
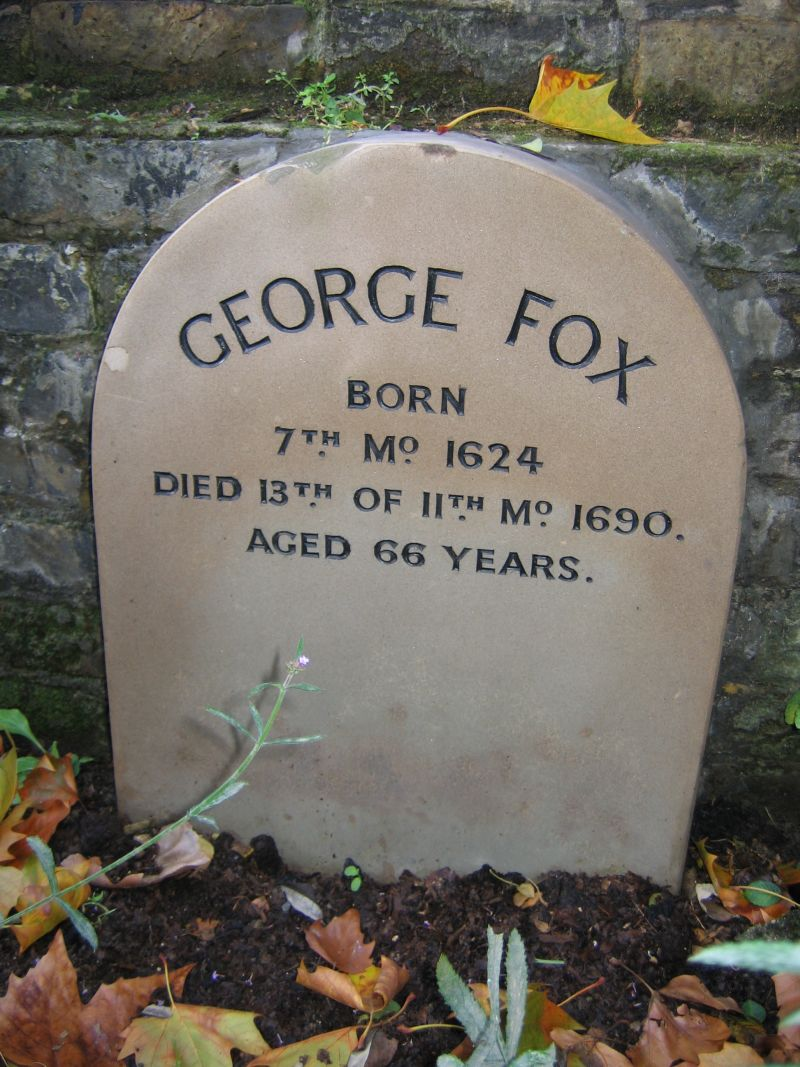
George Fox's marker in Bunhill Fields, next to the Meeting House

In the last years of his life, Fox continued to participate in the London Meetings, and still made representations to Parliament about the sufferings of Friends. The new King, James II, pardoned religious dissenters jailed for failure to attend the established church, leading to the release of about 1,500 Friends. Though the Quakers lost influence after the Glorious Revolution, which deposed James II, the Act of Toleration 1689 put an end to the uniformity laws under which Quakers had been persecuted, permitting them to assemble freely.

Two days after preaching as usual at the Gracechurch Street Meeting House in London, George Fox died between 9 and 10 p.m. on 13 January 1690 O.S. (23 January 1691 N.S.). He was interred three days later in the Quaker Burying Ground, in the presence of thousands of mourners.

== Works ==
=== Book of Miracles ===
George Fox performed hundreds of healings throughout his preaching ministry, the records of which were collected in a notable but now lost book titled Book of Miracles. This book was listed in the catalogue of George Fox's work maintained by the Library of the Society of Friends at Friends House, London. In 1932, Henry Cadbury found a reference to Book of Miracles in the catalogue, which included the beginning and ending of each account of a miraculous cure. The book was then reconstructed based on this resource and journal accounts. According to Rufus M. Jones, the Book of Miracles "makes it possible for us to follow George Fox as he went about his seventeenth-century world, not only preaching his fresh messages of life and power, but as a remarkable healer of disease with the undoubted reputation of miracle-worker." The Book of Miracles was deliberately suppressed in favour of printing Fox's Journal and other writings.

=== Journal ===
Fox's Journal was first published in 1694, after editing by Thomas Ellwood – a friend and associate of John Milton – with a preface by William Penn. Like most similar works of its time the journal was not written contemporaneously to the events it describes, but rather compiled many years later, much of it dictated. Parts of the journal were not in fact by Fox at all, but constructed by its editors from diverse sources and written as if by him. The dissent within the movement and the contributions of others to the development of Quakerism are largely excluded from the narrative. Fox portrays himself as always in the right and always vindicated by God's interventions on his behalf. As a religious autobiography, Rufus Jones compared it to such works as Augustine's Confessions and John Bunyan's Grace Abounding to the Chief of Sinners. It is, though, an intensely personal work with little dramatic power that only succeeds in appealing to readers after substantial editing. Historians have used it as a primary source because of its wealth of detail on ordinary life in the 17th century, and the many towns and villages which Fox visited.

=== Epistles ===
Hundreds of Fox's letters – mostly intended for wide circulation, along with a few private communications – were also published. Written from the 1650s onwards, with such titles as Friends, seek the peace of all men or To Friends, to know one another in the light, they give enormous insight into the detail of Fox's beliefs and show his determination to spread them. These writings, in the words of Henry Cadbury, Professor of Divinity at Harvard University and a prominent Quaker, "contain a few fresh phrases of his own, [but] are generally characterized by an excess of scriptural language and today they seem dull and repetitious". Others point out that "Fox's sermons, rich in biblical metaphor and common speech, brought hope in a dark time."

== Legacy ==
Fox had a tremendous influence on the Society of Friends and his beliefs have largely been carried forward. Perhaps his most significant achievement, other than his predominant influence in the early movement, was his leadership in overcoming the twin challenges of government persecution after the Restoration and internal disputes that threatened its stability during the same period. Not all of his beliefs were welcome to all Quakers: his Puritan-like opposition to the arts and rejection of theological study, forestalled development of these practices among Quakers for some time. The George Fox room at Friends House, London, UK is named after him.

Walt Whitman, who was raised by parents inspired by Quaker principles, later wrote: "George Fox stands for something too – a thought – the thought that wakes in silent hours – perhaps the deepest, most eternal thought latent in the human soul. This is the thought of God, merged in the thoughts of moral right and the immortality of identity. Great, great is this thought – aye, greater than all else."

George Fox University, a private Christian university in Newberg, Oregon, United States, is named after him. It was originally founded as a school for Quakers in 1891 and is now the largest private university in Oregon with more than 4,000 students.

Fox is remembered in the Church of England with a commemoration on 13 January.

== See also ==
- Christian anarchism
- Christian mysticism
- List of abolitionist forerunners
- List of people on the postage stamps of Ireland
- Lewis Benson, Fox historian
