= Jack Sinclair =

Jack or Jackie Sinclair may refer to:

- Jack Sinclair (baseball) (born 1999), American baseball player
- Jack Sinclair (footballer) (born 1995), Australian rules footballer for St Kilda
- Jack Sinclair (physiologist) (1927–2018), New Zealand neurophysiologist and middle-distance athlete
- Jack Sinclair (poker player) (born 1990), English professional poker player
- Jack Sinclair (rugby league) (1935–2006), Australian rugby league player
- Jack Sinclair (Scouting) (fl. 2004), president and international commissioner of Scouts Canada
- Jackie Sinclair (1943–2010), Scottish footballer

== See also ==
- John Sinclair (disambiguation)
- Jonathan Sinclair (disambiguation)
