= Scheduled monuments in Coventry =

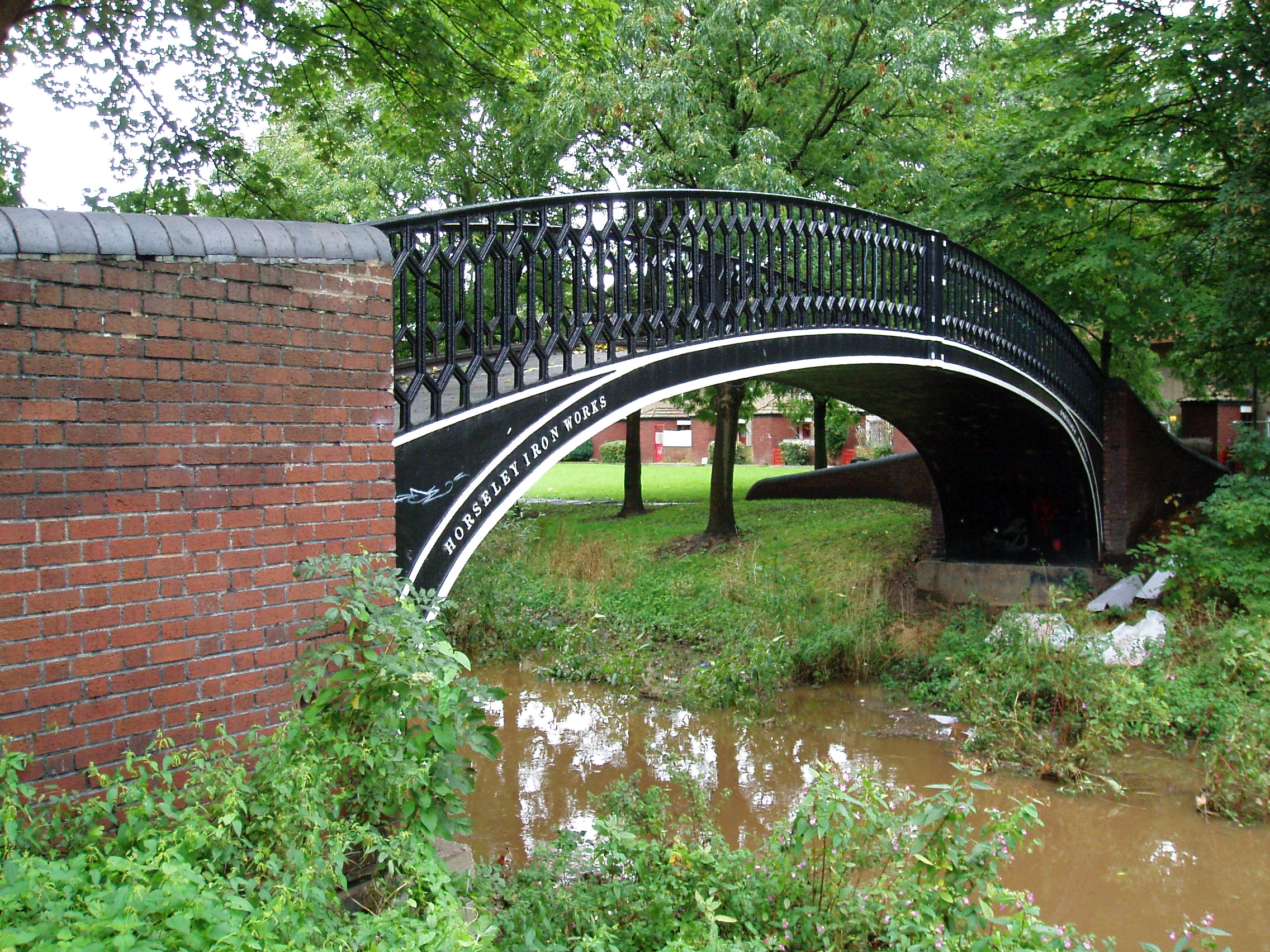
The Vignoles Bridge over the River Sherbourne in Spon End

There are ten scheduled monuments in Coventry. In the United Kingdom, a scheduled monument is a "nationally important" archaeological site or historic building that has been given protection against unauthorised change by being placed on a list (or "schedule") by the Secretary of State for Digital, Culture, Media and Sport; English Heritage takes the leading role in identifying such sites. Monuments are defined in the Ancient Monuments and Archaeological Areas Act 1979 and the National Heritage Act 1983. Scheduled monuments—sometimes referred to as scheduled ancient monuments—can also be protected through listed building procedures, and English Heritage considers listed building status to be a better way of protecting buildings and standing structures. A scheduled monument that is later determined to "no longer merit scheduling" can be descheduled.

Coventry is an ancient city and a metropolitan borough in the West Midlands of England. The city's history dates back to at least the 11th century (CE), and by the 14th century, it was a thriving centre of commerce. Like several of the other monuments in the city, Coventry's city walls were erected towards the end of the 14th and the beginning of the 15th centuries, though city walls served little defensive purpose by that time and were largely a status symbol.

The oldest monuments on this list—Caludon Castle and St Mary's Priory and Cathedral—were built in the 11th century. Both are now ruins. Coventry's most modern scheduled monument is Vignoles Bridge—a single-span iron footbridge over the River Sherbourne, made in 1835 and moved to its current location in 1969.

== Monuments ==
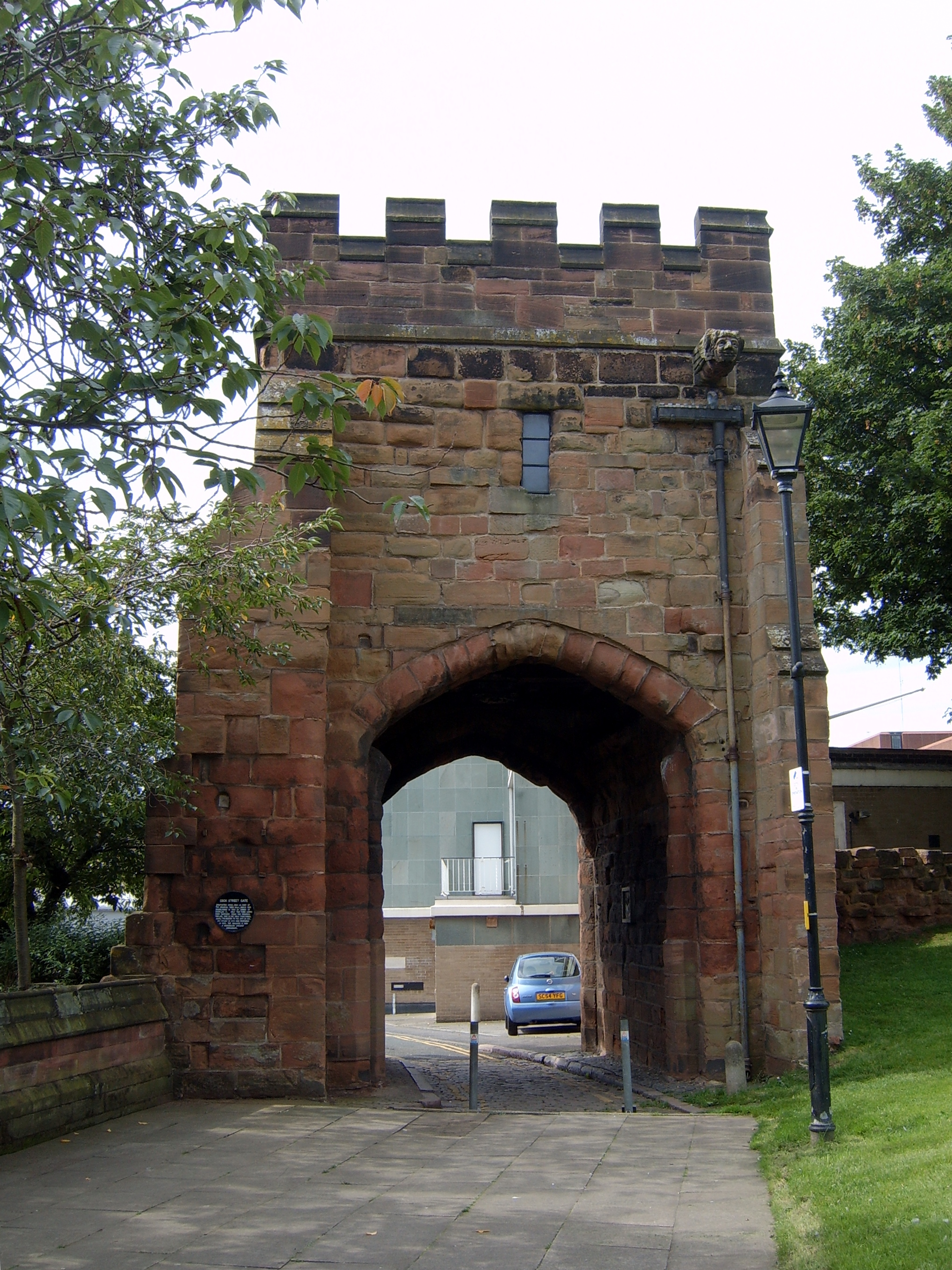
Cook Street Gate, the only functional city gate remaining in Coventry

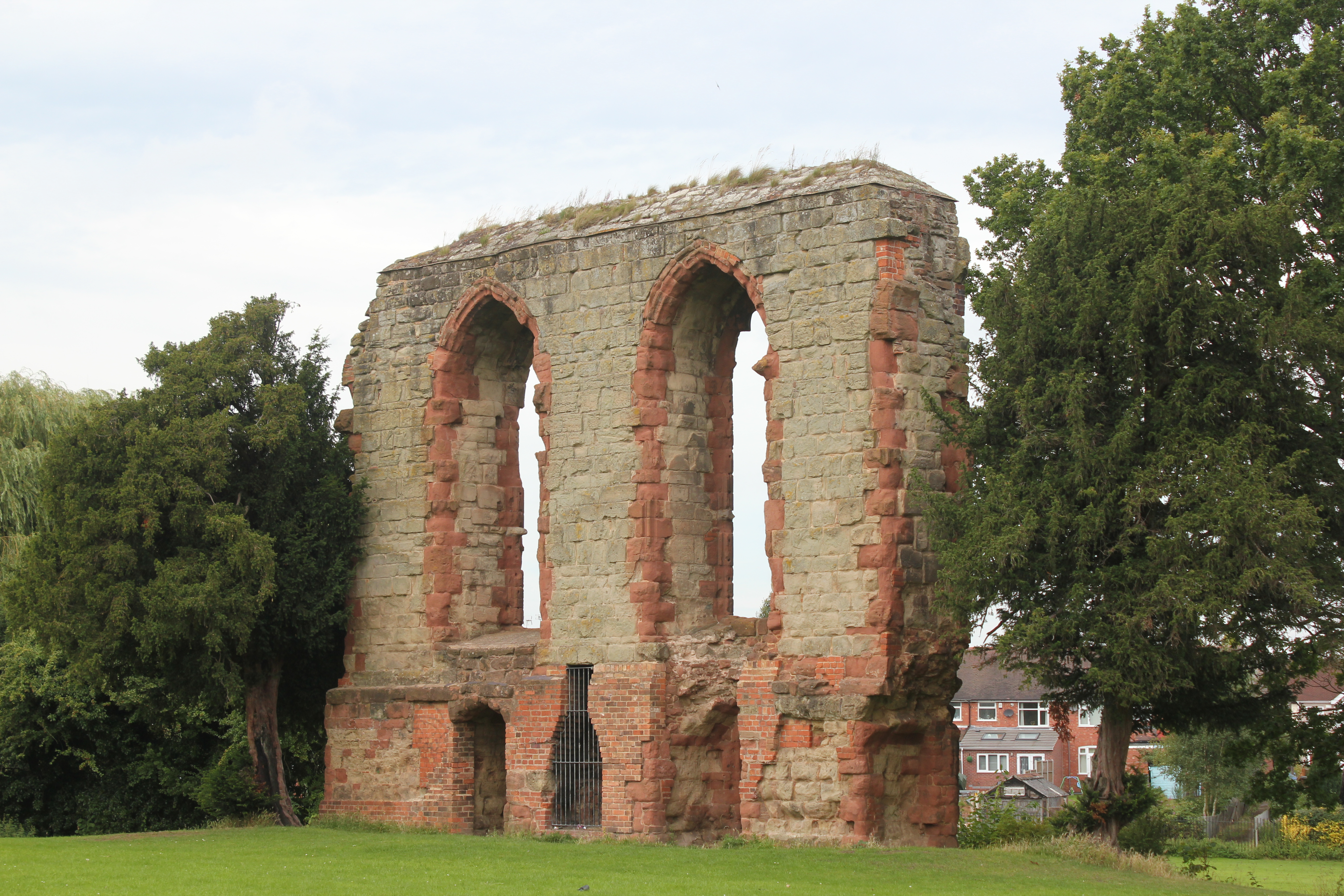
The wall fragment that is all that remains of the ancient Caludon Castle

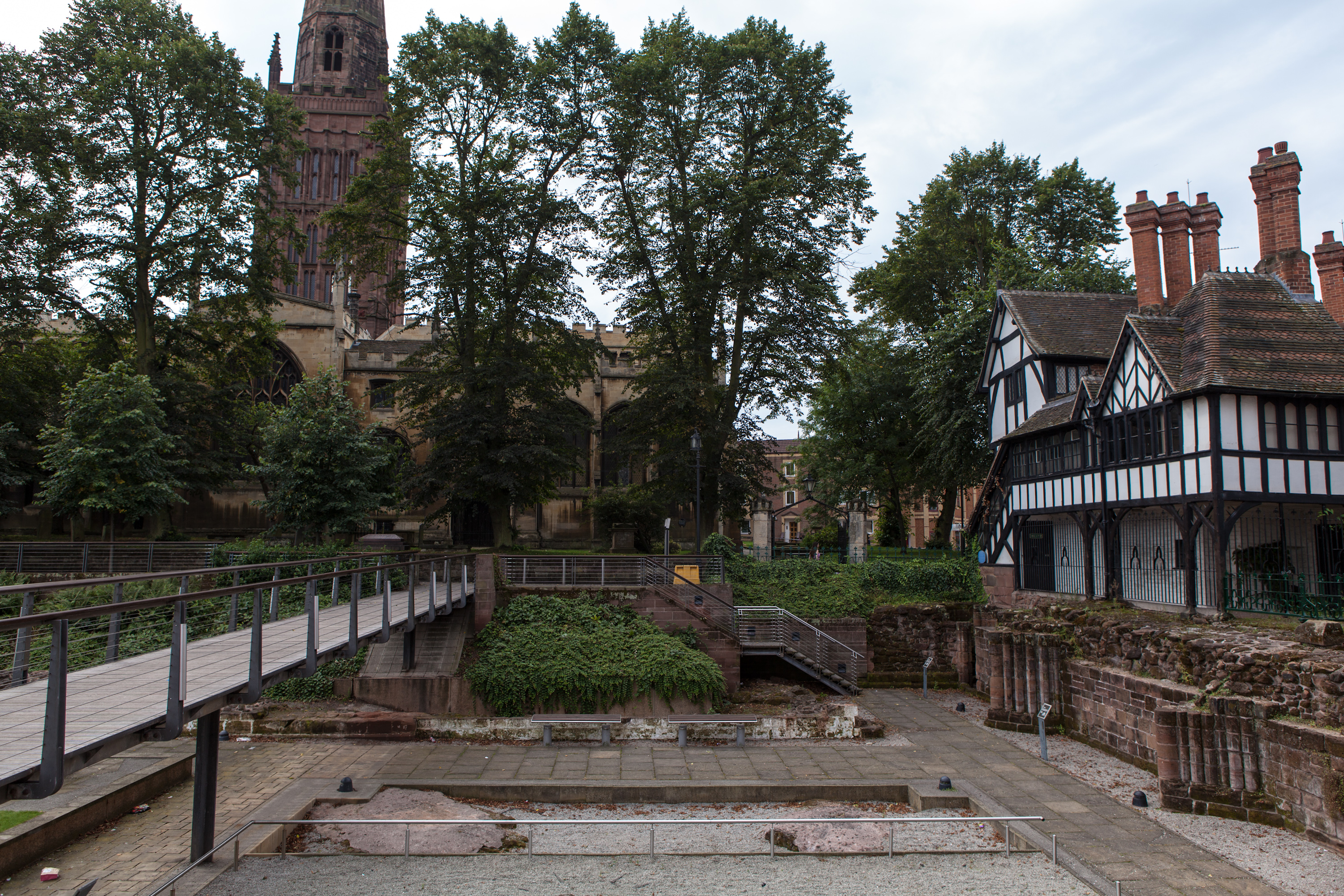
The ruins of St Mary's Priory and Cathedral, now a garden

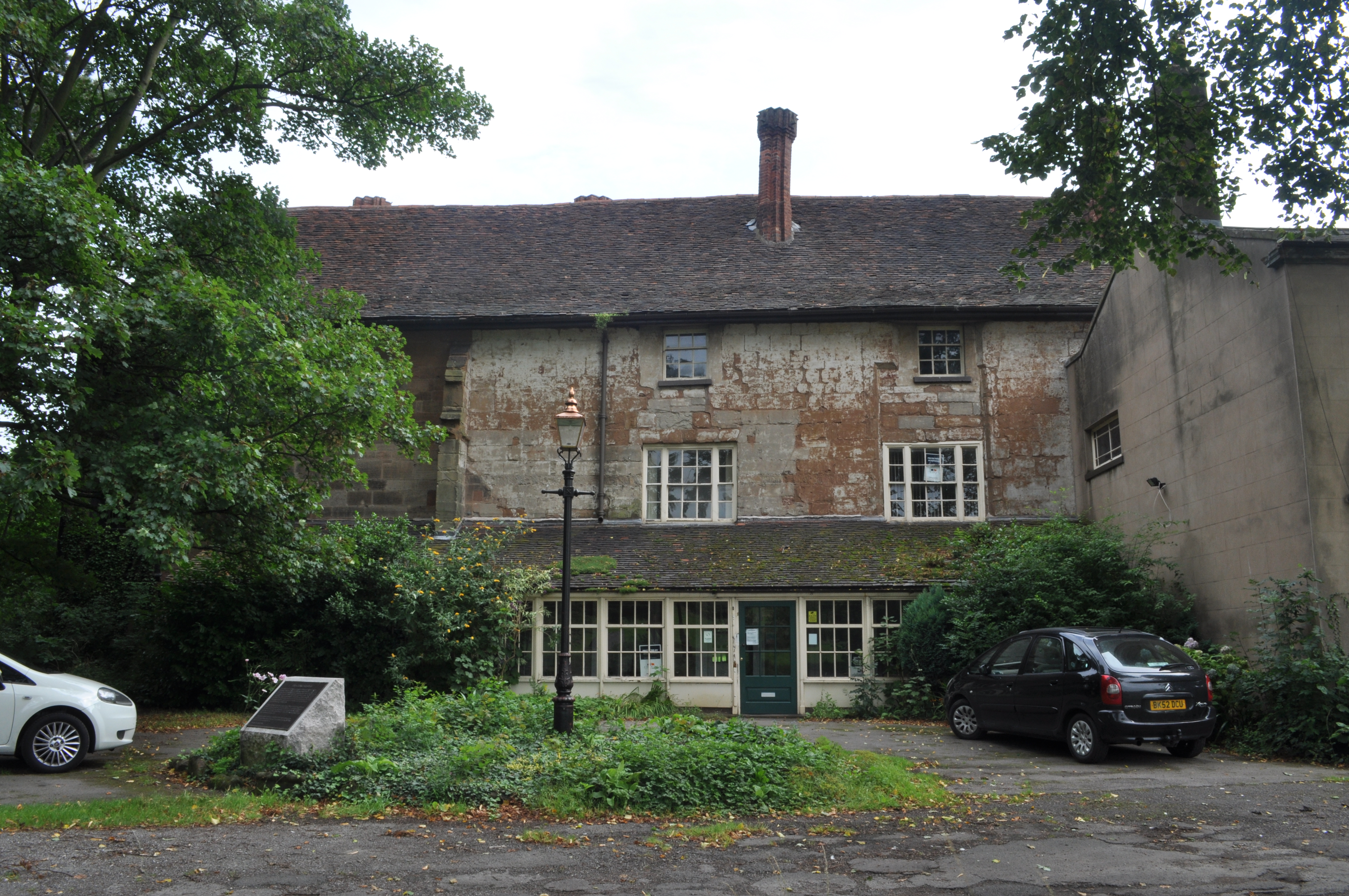
The Charterhouse—the building has been heavily rebuilt, but incorporates the remains of the 14th-century original.

Name	Built	Location	OS Grid ref (Note: Sometimes known as OSGB36, the grid reference is based on the British national grid reference system used by the Ordnance Survey.)	Description	Ref
Allesley Castle	Unknown; between 1066-1387	Torbay Road, Allesley	SP 29906 80049	All that remains of the castle is a large mound—the motte—and a defensive ditch approximately 45 metres (148 ft) in diameter. The ditch contains several concrete blocks which are thought to be bases for bridges over the motte. There is little documentary evidence for the history of the castle except that it was seized from the estate of Robert Fitch in 1588, though there is speculation that it may have been built in the 14th century by Lord Hastings, who built another fortification in Fillongley, seven miles away. English Heritage believe the site contains artefacts which will reveal more about the construction and history of the castle.	
Caludon Castle	Pre-1066	Farren Road, Wyken	SP 37379 80159	All that remains of Caludon Castle is a large grey sandstone wall, but the site was occupied from at least the 11th century until 1815. The site was occupied by several buildings, including a manor, a castle (for which it is named), and a large house, and the surviving wall fragment now sits in an urban park to the east of Coventry city centre. The ruin is also a Grade I listed building.	
Cook Street Gate	14th century	Cook Street, city centre	SP 33535 79448	One of two remaining gates in the city walls, built in the first quarter of the 14th century. Cook Street Gate is a crenellated red sandstone tower above an arch, and is the only functional gate left in the city of the original 12 (Swanswell Gate also survives, but is not functional as a gate). The gate is also a Grade I listed building.	
Coventry city walls (remains)	14th century	Multiple locations, city centre	SP 32994 79106, SP 33009 79142, SP 33028 79070, SP 33174 79304, SP 33214 79418, SP 33525 79459, SP 33548 79431, SP 33564 79342, SP 33912 78553, SP 34014 78995, SP 34156 78914, SP 34182 78692, SP 34223 78710	Coventry was not walled until the 14th century, by which time the walls were largely a status symbol and had little practical use in defending the city. The walls were built with local red sandstone and included 12 gatehouses. They were torn down in the 17th century on the order of King Charles II in revenge for Coventry's heavily Parliamentarian stance during the English Civil War. Only fragments of the wall survive, of which the most complete is attached to Swanswell Gate, one of the two surviving gatehouses (the other being Cook Street Gate, which also appears on this list).	
Moated site at Bishop Ullathorne School	pre-1597	Leasowes Avenue	SP 31641 75744	A post-mediaeval moated site. The site is now occupied by a school, and is bisected by a road, for which parts of the moat have been built over. The site is roughly square, and was surrounded by a moat, which is now dry except for the southern corner, where the moat projects out to form a pond area. English Heritage believe that "features associated with the occupation of the moated site" are buried.	
Moated Site at Ernesford Grange	Pre-1279	Princethorpe Way, Binley	SP 37021 77584	A moated site in roughly the shape of a square. The northern arm of moat still contains water, while the other three arms are dry. The interior was accessed by a causeway over the eastern arm of moat. Excavation in 1971 revealed that the site was once occupied by an L-shaped sandstone building. The earliest documentation of the site records it as being the property of Coombe Abbey in 1279. The site remained the property of the abbey until the Dissolution of the Monasteries in the 16th century, when it became the property of Thomas Broke.	
St Mary's Priory and Cathedral (ruins)	1043	Priory Row, city centre	SP 33490 79109	11th-century priory built by Lady Godiva and Leofric, Earl of Mercia. The exposed foundations are the only surviving architecture, and a garden has been built around them. The priory was rediscovered in the 19th century when the Blue Coat School was first built. The site has been excavated several times throughout the 20th and 21st century.	
Moated Site south of Caludon Castle	12th century	Farren Road, Wyken	SP 37379 80159	A moat 190 metres (620 ft) to the south of Caludon Castle. The moat is now dry, but the southern part may have contained water as late as 1890. The site may have been a separate enclosure associated with the castle (which is also scheduled).	
Site of the Charterhouse	1381	London Road, Cheylesmore	SP 34514 78204	A plot of land off London Road, to the south of the city centre. The original building on the site was the Charterhouse of St Anne, founded in 1381. The current building is the result of many later additions, including timber-framing on the north side. The doors and many of the windows date from the 18th century. Also included in the listing are a collection of 15th- and 16th-century paintings. The Charterhouse is one of a group of listed buildings on the site.	
Vignoles Bridge	1835	Meadow Street, Spon End	SP 32699 78831	A cast-iron single-span footbridge over the River Sherbourne just west of Coventry city centre. The bridge was built around 1835 at Horseley Ironworks in Tipton and designed by Charles Vignoles. It originally spanned the Oxford Canal and was moved to its current site in 1969.	

== See also ==
- History of Coventry
- Grade I listed buildings in Coventry
- Grade II* listed buildings in Coventry
