= Jonathan Sinclair (disambiguation) =

Jonathan Sinclair (born 1970), is a British diplomat.

Jonathan Sinclair or Jon Sinclair may also refer to:

- Jon Sinclair (runner) in USA Cross Country Championships
- Jonathan Sinclair, executive producer of Oprah: Where Are They Now?

== See also ==
- Jack Sinclair (disambiguation)
- John Sinclair (disambiguation)
