= St Mary's Priory and Cathedral =

Ruins of the first cathedral in Coventry, England

Coordinates: 52.4089°N 1.5085°W

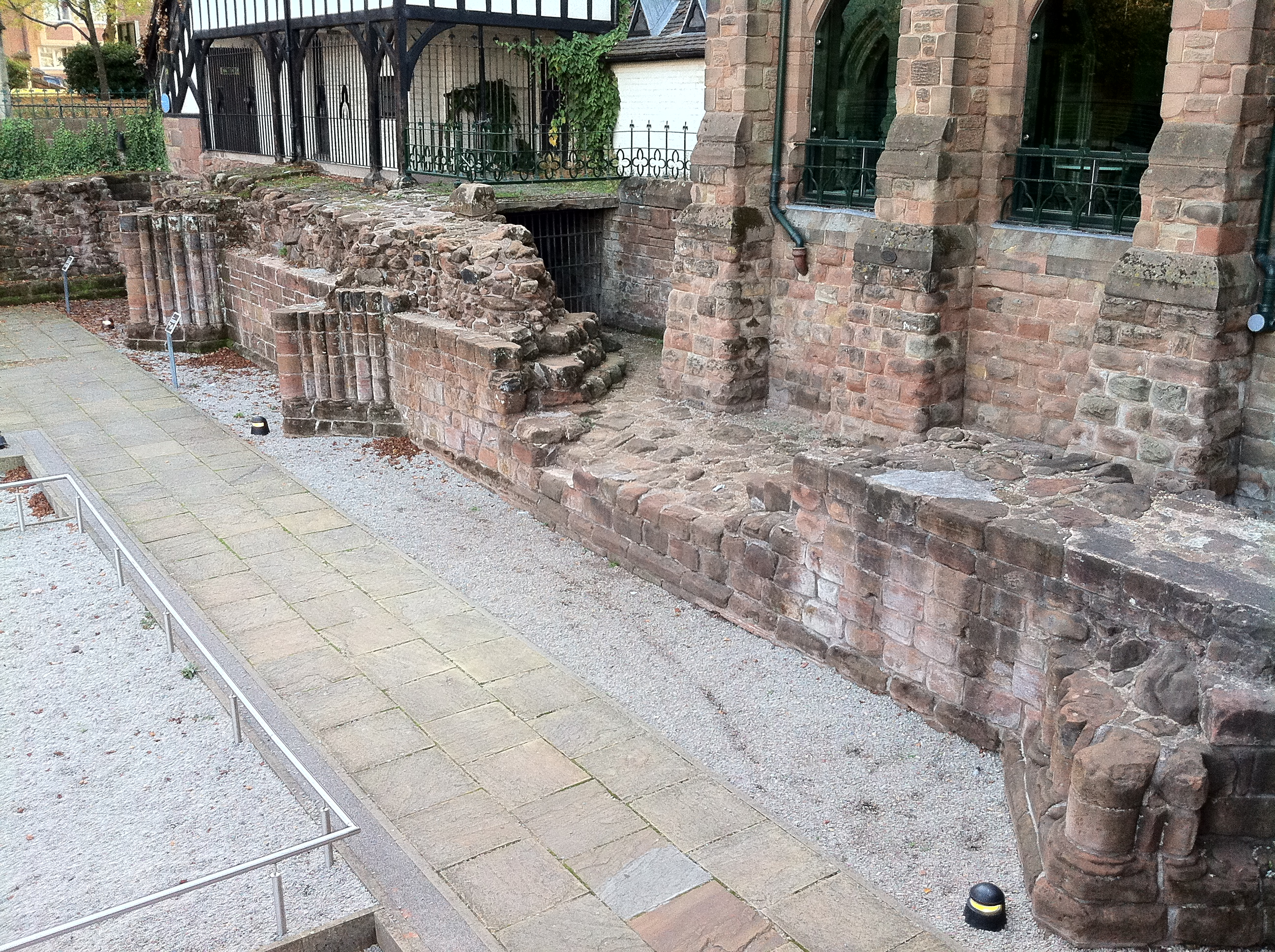
- West wall ruins of St Mary's Cathedral
- St Mary's Priory and Cathedral
- Denomination: Roman Catholic

Architecture
- Style: Gothic Architecture
- Closed: 1539
- Demolished: 1545

St Mary's Priory and Cathedral was an institution in Coventry, England, founded in the 12th century by transformation of the former monastery of St Mary, and destroyed during the Dissolution of the Monasteries in the early 16th century. It was located on a site north of Holy Trinity and the former St Michael's parish churches in the centre of the city, on a site bordered by Priory Row to the south, Trinity Street to the west, and the River Sherbourne to the north. Excavated remains from the west end of the cathedral are open to the public.

== Origins ==
The first chronicled event in the history of Coventry took place in 1016 when King Canute and his army of Danes were laying waste to many towns and villages in Warwickshire in a bid to take control of England, and on reaching the settlement of Coventry they destroyed the Saxon nunnery founded by St Osburg. Leofric, Earl of Mercia and his wife Lady Godiva rebuilt on the remains of the nunnery to found a Benedictine monastery in 1043 dedicated to St Mary for an abbot and 24 monks. John of Worcester tells us that "He and his wife, the noble Countess Godgifu, a worshipper of God and devout lover of St Mary ever-virgin, built the monastery there from the foundations out of their own patrimony, and endowed it adequately with lands and made it so rich in various ornaments that in no monastery in England might be found the abundance of gold, silver, gems and precious stones that was at that time in its possession."

Bishop Robert de Limesey transferred his see to Coventry c. 1095, and in 1102 papal authorisation for this move also turned the monastery of St Mary into a priory and cathedral. The subsequent rebuilding and expansion of St Mary's was completed about 125 years later.

When the monastery was founded Leofric gave the northern half of his estates in Coventry to the monks to support them. This was known as the "Prior's-half", and the other was called the "Earl's-half" which would later pass to the Earls of Chester, and explains the early division of Coventry into two parts (until the Royal "Charter of Incorporation" was granted in 1345). In 1250, Roger de Mold (referred to in older documents as "Roger de Montalt"), the earl at the time who had gained his position by marriage, sold his wife's rights and estates in the southern side of Coventry to the Prior, and for the next 95 years the town was controlled by a single "land lord." However, disputes arose between the monastic tenants and those previously of the Earl, and the Prior never gained complete control over Coventry.

== Architecture ==
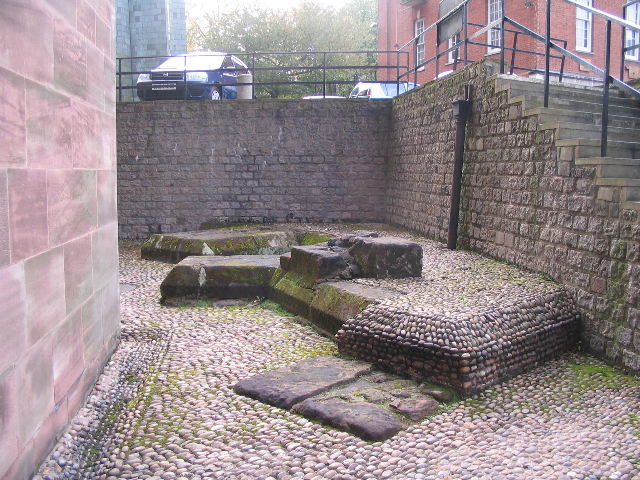
What was once believed to be the remains of the east end of St Mary's, beside the current cathedral.

The main cathedral building was cruciform in shape, 425 feet (130 metres) long and 145 feet (44 metres) wide at the west front. It was constructed in two stages, up to 1143 and from c. 1150 to c. 1250. The cathedral had a central tower and two towers at the western end, the remains of which are still visible. It is believed there were three spires similar to, though pre-dating, those at Lichfield Cathedral.

== History ==
The abbey church of St Mary's was consecrated in 1043, and Earl Leofric was buried there in 1057.

In 1143 Robert Marmion fortified the partially-built cathedral in an attempt to gain control of Coventry Castle. Part of his alterations include a trench around the church.

In 1459 the Parliament of Devils was held during the Wars of the Roses in the chapter house of the Benedictine priory.

During Henry VIII's Dissolution of the Monasteries in the 16th century, the king offered the cathedral buildings to the people of Coventry, however they were unable to raise sufficient funding, and the king ordered the buildings destroyed. Masonry and other items were removed and used for other purposes, leaving only parts of the cathedral standing. It was the only English cathedral to be destroyed during the Reformation. In 1539 the seat of the diocese was transferred to Lichfield Cathedral, and it was renamed the Diocese of Lichfield and Coventry.

The north-west tower survived the destruction and was used as a house until 1714, when a charity school was founded there, Coventry's Blue Coat School.

Coventry remained without a cathedral until 1918, when St Michael's parish church (built in the 14th and 15th centuries, and so originally standing simultaneously with St Mary's) was elevated to this status. St Michael's was severely damaged during the Coventry Blitz on 14 November 1940 by the German Luftwaffe, and replaced after the war by the current St Michael's Cathedral.

== Rediscovery and excavations ==
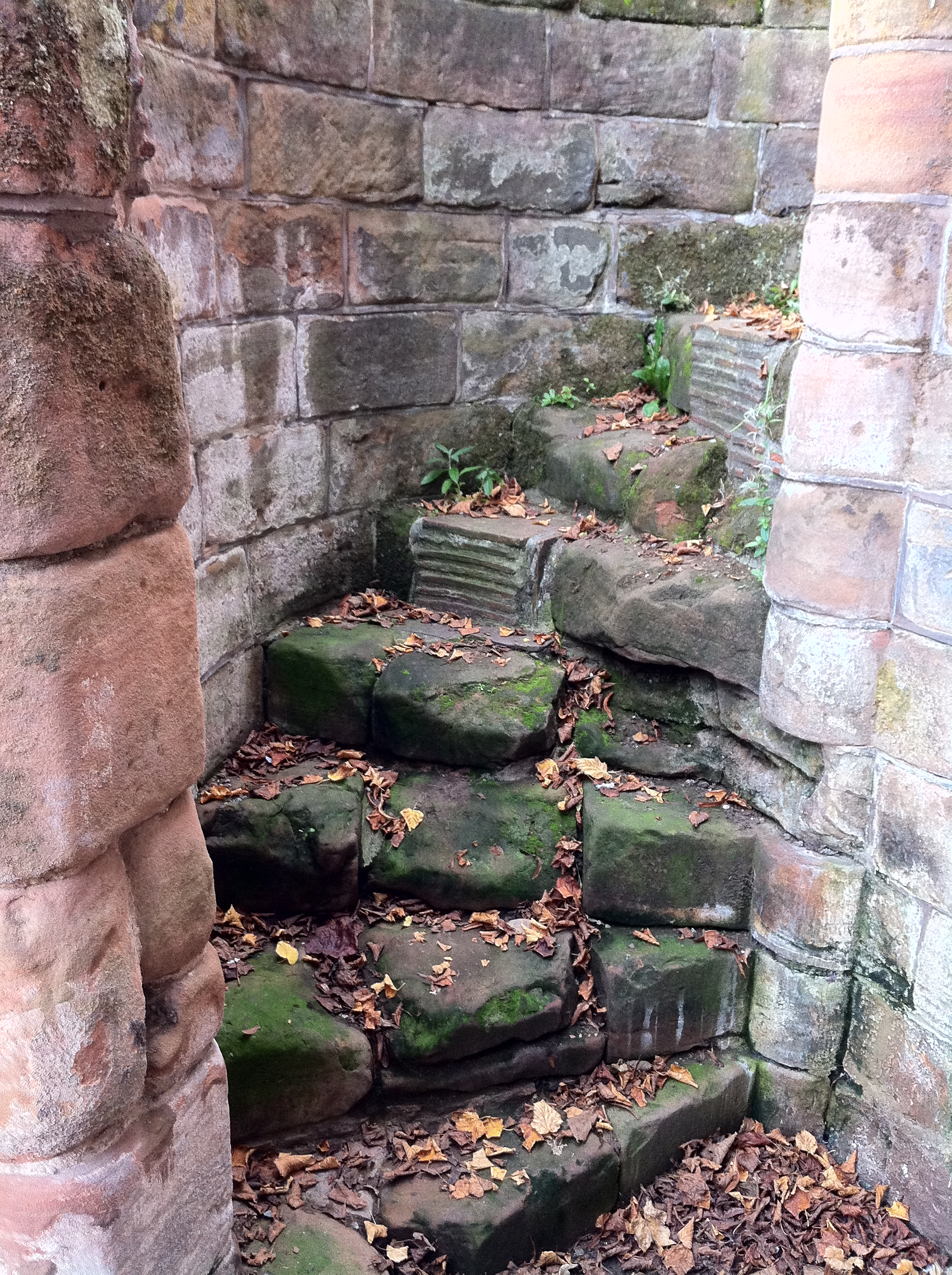
Remains of helical staircase in south-west tower

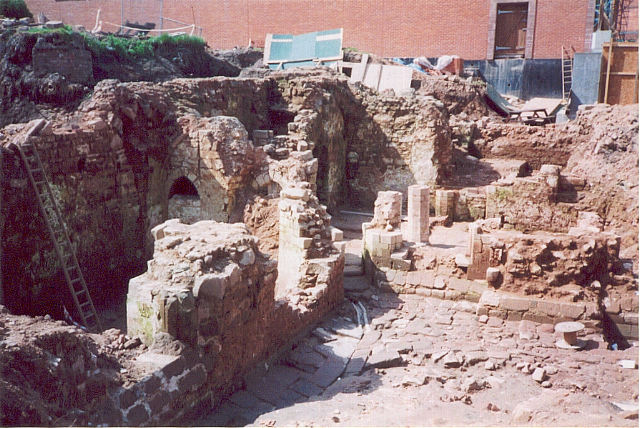
View from Hill Top of the undercroft's excavation. Some of the area has been reburied.

In 1856 the Blue Coat School was rebuilt on the same site, and during the construction the remains of the cathedral's west wall were discovered, including the foot of the south-west tower and its spiral staircase. The school building remains on the site, but the school itself moved to a new location in the 1960s.

An excavation in the 1960s discovered the original doorway to the chapter house.

In the late 1990s Coventry City Council decided to redevelop part of the cathedral site as a public park as part of its Phoenix Initiative, and invited the Channel 4 programme Time Team to perform an archaeological dig on the site.

The dig took place in April 1999 and consisted of four main trenches. One was in the site of the chapter house, one was to reach the original floor, four metres below the current ground level, and two were to identify the locations of the two crossing piers which would have borne the weight of the tower and roof.

The archaeologists digging in the chapter house were unable to locate the doorway that had been photographed during the 1960s excavations, and it was not until the third day of their three-day dig that they decided it must have been removed by the earlier team (which should have been recorded at the time). This delay meant that it was not until the end of the final day that a stone-lined grave was discovered at the bottom of the trench. Several members of the team extended their dig into a fourth day to investigate this find more fully.

Work on the fourth day revealed remains of a body in the grave just inside the chapter house door. Forensic examination carried out by the programme suggested that the person died in late-middle age and was overweight and diabetic. They concluded it was likely the man had been a prior.

Time Team revisited the excavation site for a programme in March 2001 to explore some of the discoveries made since their earlier episode. Coventry Archaeology had continued a dig on the priory, while Northampton Archaeology carried out digs on the cathedral. One of the featured findings was a layer of clay around the entrance, which still carried markings from the wheels of carts believed to have been removing stone after the building was demolished.

Another discovery in December 2000 was the 14th-century 'Apocalypse Mural'. During removal of debris from an undercroft, a small piece of masonry bearing a painted gold crown was discovered, and this discovery was followed several days later by a larger item. A piece of sandstone was found measuring 43 cm by 50 cm, with a painted area covering 20 cm by 30 cm showing four heads, three of which were wearing crowns.

Remains are visible from both ends of the cathedral building revealing a length of 425 feet (130 m).

Following the excavations parts of the remains are open to the public as the 'Priory Garden' which can be walked through or above on wooden walkways. The site of the cloisters has also become a park, with a visitor centre containing some of the artefacts excavated.

== Burials ==
- Leofric, Earl of Mercia
- Lady Godiva
- Ælfgar, Earl of Mercia
- John Hastings, 1st Baron Hastings and wife Isabel de Valence
- Richard Gernon of Wybunbury, 2nd son of Ranulf de Gernon, 4th Earl of Chester

== See also ==
- Scheduled Ancient Monuments in Coventry
- Grade I listed buildings in Coventry
