= John St Clair =

John St Clair may refer to:

- John St Clair, Master of Sinclair (1683–1750), Scottish heir apparent and British MP for Dysart Burghs
- John St. Clair (born 1977), American football offensive tackle

== See also ==
- John Sinclair (disambiguation)
