= Fifty nine Particulars laid down for the Regulating things =

1659 pamphlet by George Fox

Fifty nine Particulars laid down for the Regulating things is an English pamphlet that scholars attribute to publication in 1659 by George Fox, founding preacher of Quakerism. It calls for a long list of social reforms, and purports to have been sent to members of Parliament, which ignored it. The pamphlet was never reprinted, probably due to its politically assertive nature and the desire of post-Restoration Quakers to make themselves respectable and non-threatening to the established authorities, who ever since the execution of Charles I had been concerned about political revolution. Though long unknown to mass Quaker audiences, it was never a "lost" document, being known to some historians (Quaker and otherwise) throughout the period until its republication in 2002, online and in print, by the Quaker Universalist Fellowship.

== Ingle commentary ==
The introduction by H. Larry Ingle in the QUF edition associates George Fox with the "Good Old Cause" or "revolution," which had convulsed England since the early 1640s and resulted in the execution of the king in 1649. Many early Quakers were soldiers or veterans and longed to see the fruits of their military service preserved; Fox was only articulating the goals of many of these folk. The Introduction also suggests that Fox may have been a "manic-depressive" who retreated to a state of depression for 10 weeks after Parliament failed to consider the proposals and voted to restore the monarchy.

== Consistency issues relative to Fox's other writings ==
While most of the 59 articles are compatible with Fox's views as recorded elsewhere, nowhere in the Journal's many letters to government, or in his 410 Epistles, did Fox request government to aid him by legislating his views, beyond hopes to:

1. stop the persecution of Quakers,
2. simplify laws so that every citizen could carry a copy of all laws of the country in their pocket,
3. make the laws compatible with "the conscience of all men", and
4. in the context of Parliament enacting legislation reviewing the credentials of priests, not to approve any who asked for money.

To the contrary, Fox frequently wrote strong criticism against religious sects that sought the aid of governments to uphold their religious doctrines. All of the requests to government in the "Fifty nine Particulars," other than to relieve persecution of the Quakers, are not compatible with any of Fox's hundreds of published letters, pamphlets, and books; nor the publishings of countless other early Quakers, (See Discussion). Such incompatibilities only serve to underscore the hope and desperation he no doubt experienced and the basic radicalism contained in the document. Examples of such restraint, despite his opposing the wearing of crosses, include never instructing Quakers to remove them from their Bibles, nor suggesting removal crosses from the flag, and his mentions, several times in his Journal, of using a market cross for posting notices).
