= John Sinclair (footballer) =

Australian rules footballer

Personal information
- Full name: John Sinclair
- Born: 29 June 1948 (age 78)
- Original team: Ballarat
- Height: 183 cm (6 ft 0 in)
- Weight: 81 kg (179 lb)
- Position: Half-back flank

Playing career^{1}
Years	Club	Games (Goals)
1968–69	Essendon	2 (0)
- ^{1} Playing statistics correct to the end of 1969.

John Sinclair (born 29 June 1948) is a former Australian rules footballer who played with Essendon in the Victorian Football League (VFL). He was a member of Essendon's reserves premiership team in 1968 and played two senior VFL games in 1969.
