= John S. Sinclair =

American lawyer and financier (1897–1972)

4th President of the Federal Reserve Bank of Philadelphia
- In office 1936–1941
- Preceded by: George W. Norris
- Succeeded by: Alfred H. Williams

Personal details
- Born: April 6, 1897 Brooklyn, New York
- Died: October 29, 1972 (aged 75) Wilton, Connecticut
- Spouse: Mary Hewes Biddle
- Education: Columbia University (BA, LLB)

John Stephens Sinclair (April 6, 1897 – October 29, 1972) was an American lawyer and financier who served as the fourth president of the Federal Reserve Bank of Philadelphia from 1936 to 1941. He was also president of the National Industrial Conference Board from 1948 to 1963.

== Early life and education ==
Sinclair was born in Brooklyn, New York City in 1897. He served in the US Army during World War I as a second lieutenant and graduated from Columbia College in 1920 before receiving his LLB from Columbia Law School in 1922. He married Mary Hewes Biddle, a member of the Biddle family of Philadelphia and granddaughter of architect Addison Hutton, that year.

== Career ==
Sinclair entered private legal practice before joining the Federal Reserve Bank of Philadelphia as associate counsel and became deputy governor in 1934. He became president in 1936 and served in that role until 1941, when he resigned to become vice president of New York Life Insurance Company. He became director and executive vice president the following year.

In 1941, Sinclair was elected president of the National Industrial Conference Board. He also served as a director of Union Pacific Railroad and was a member of the New York Yacht Club.

== Death ==
Sinclair died on October 29, 1972, at his home in Wilton, Connecticut.
