= Mancetter =

Village in Warwickshire, England

Coordinates: 52.569°N 1.529°W

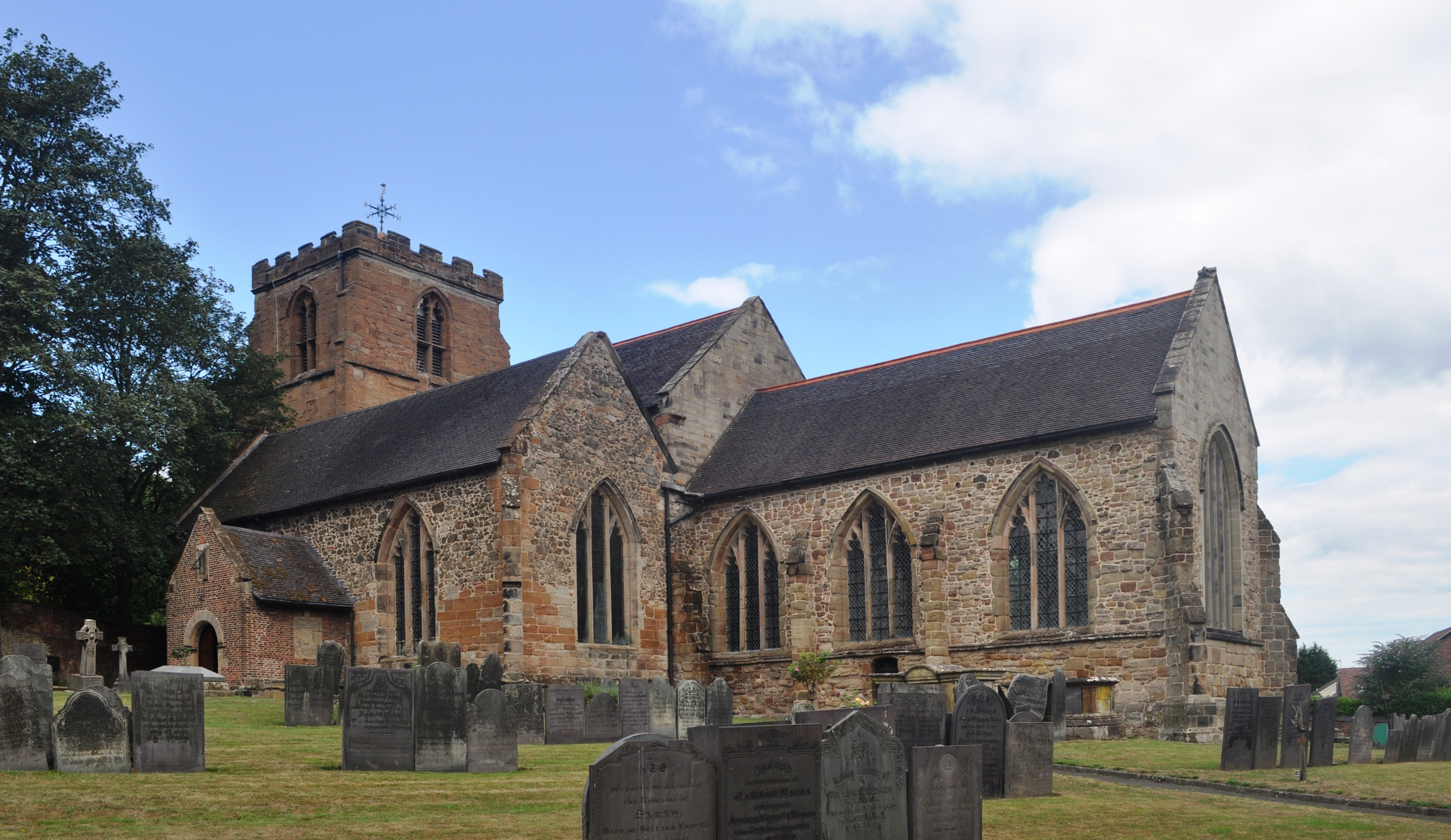
- St. Peter's parish church

- Location within Warwickshire
- Population: 2,528 (2021 census)
- OS grid reference: SP3296
- Civil parish: Mancetter
- District: North Warwickshire
- Shire county: Warwickshire
- Region: West Midlands
- Country: England
- Sovereign state: United Kingdom
- Post town: Atherstone
- Postcode district: CV9
- Dialling code: 01827
- Police: Warwickshire
- Fire: Warwickshire
- Ambulance: West Midlands
- UK Parliament: North Warwickshire and Bedworth
- Website: Welcome to Mancetter Parish

Mancetter is a village and civil parish in North Warwickshire, England, where Watling Street crosses the River Anker. The population was 2,528 at the 2021 census. It is contiguous with the town of Atherstone, on the B4111 road towards Hartshill and Nuneaton.

== History ==
In Roman Britain, a posting station was built along Watling Street close to the river crossing, and a rectangular earthwork of this is still extant. The much larger legionary fortress of the Legio XIV Gemina was built here by about 50 AD, before the legion moved to Wroxeter in about 55. Around the fortress grew the settlement of Manduessedum. Mancetter has been suggested as a possible location of the Defeat of Boudica, between an alliance of indigenous British peoples led by Boudica and a Roman army led by Gaius Suetonius Paulinus, although the exact location is unknown.

Mancetter does not appear in the Domesday Book of 1086, but in 1196 a Walter de Mancetter granted land to endow the parish church. The chancel walls of the Church of England parish church of Saint Peter still include 12th-century masonry. The chancel and nave were remodelled early in the 13th century and the north aisle was added later in the 13th century. The bell tower, the south aisle and the clerestory of the nave all seem to have been added in the 15th century. The south porch was added early in the 17th century. Restoration work was carried out in 1876, 1911 and 1930, and the Gothic Revival architect C.C. Rolfe may have undertaken restoration work in 1899.

The tower has a peal of five bells, of which the oldest was cast about 1350, another early in the 16th century and the treble, tenor and third bell in the middle of the 17th century. The advowson of St. Peter's was impropriated by the Cistercian Abbey of Merevale in 1449. Mancetter Manor is a timber-framed building dating from about 1330. An intermediate floor was inserted in the great hall in about 1480 and the south wing was added in about 1580. The central chimneystack was probably inserted in the 17th century, and small extensions to the house were made in the 18th and 19th centuries.

== Etymology ==
The modern name Mancetter is a reduced form of an old Celtic name Manduessedum, first recorded in the Antonine Itinerary in the 4th Century. It is composed of a British element *mandu – ‘horse’ or ‘pony’ and a Gaulish *essedo - ‘horse chariot’. Although the first element is common in Gaulish names, the application of the second element to a place-name is obscure. The second element of the modern name is ultimately from the OE -ceaster – ‘a city, an old (Roman) fortification, Roman site’. By the time of the Norman Conquest in 1066 ceaster was probably pronounced roughly like modern "Chester". The form -cetter reflects the difficulty that some French-speaking Norman clerks had with the English sounds ch and st (compare also Exeter, Old English Escanceaster).

== Notable people ==
- John Sinclair (1860–1938), physician

== Sources ==
- Gover, J.E.B.; Mawer, A.; Stenton, F. (1936). The Place-names of Warwickshire (PDF). The English Place-name Society. pp. 85–86. ISBN 0-521049-06-7.
- Pevsner, Nikolaus; Wedgwood, Alexandra (1966). The Buildings of England: Warwickshire. Harmondsworth: Penguin Books. pp. 346–347. ISBN 0-14-071031-0.
- Rivet, A.L.E.; Smith, C. (1981). The Place-names of Roman Britain. (2nd ed.). London: Batsford. pp. 411–412. ISBN 0-7134-2077-4.
- Saint, Andrew (1970). "Three Oxford Architects". Oxoniensia. XXXV. Oxfordshire Architectural and Historical Society: 53 ff. Archived from the original on 28 September 2007.
- Salzman, L.F., ed. (1947). Victoria County History: A History of the County of Warwick, Volume 4. pp. 116–126.
