= John Sinclair (song) =

Song by John Lennon

from the album Some Time in New York City
- Released: 12 June 1972
- Recorded: February–March 1972
- Studio: The Record Plant, Los Angeles
- Genre: Country
- Length: 3:26
- Label: Apple
- Songwriter: John Lennon
- Producers: John Lennon; Yoko Ono; Phil Spector

"John Sinclair" is a song by the English musician John Lennon, released as the eighth track on his and his wife Yoko Ono's 1972 collaborative album Some Time in New York City.

== Background and composition ==
John Lennon wrote "John Sinclair" in 1971 as a response to American poet and activist John Sinclair's arrest in late 1969, finished in time for a freedom rally supporting him. Lennon had thought the poet's harsh prison sentence was proof that establishment drug laws were an attempt to silence the counterculture. In late 1971, Lennon recorded a demo with a Dobro guitar, only heard on the Lost Lennon Tapes documentary. In the lyrics, Lennon says "they gave him ten for two", referring to how many years Sinclair was sentenced to for being in possession of two marijuana joints. Two days after the rally on 13 December 1971, Sinclair was released from prison, and he his wife Leni Sinclair called Lennon and Yoko Ono while they were at the Record Plant to thank them for their support.

== Release and reception ==
"John Sinclair" was issued on Lennon and Yoko Ono's collaborative album Some Time in New York City (1972) and sequenced as the album's eighth track. During that time, the FBI was keeping a keen eye on Lennon and had many files on him; journalist Bill Harry reports that in one of those files, they claimed "John Sinclair" would "probably sell a million ... but it is lacking Lennon's usual standards".

Author Paul Du Noyer notes that "John's song has some compelling urgency, and some pungent lyrics about the CIA's involvement in drug-trafficking in Asia. What the verses lack in elegance, they make up for in honest anger." While speaking with David Sheff, Lennon himself remarked that "I'd never write a song like that now". Beatles writer Peter Doggett calls it a "bluesy, steel-guitar stomp which – true to his new ideals – told the story of Sinclair's imprisonment in semple verses." Richard Nusser called in the Village Voice a "bouncy, funky' track. Robert Rodriguez wrote that John, with his Dobro "[gave t]he resulting sound [of the song] a folkie-bluesy cast, after the style of past troubadours reporting on contemporary events." In a ranking of all 72 John Lennon solo songs, Nick DeRiso of Ultimate Classic Rock states that It "underscores the problem with this album's determined focus on the news of the day." adding that "Decades later, Sinclair has probably been forgotten by most". Authors Chip Madinger and Mark Easter called it "as stale as several-months-old bread" due to Sinclair having already been let out of jail by the time the album had been released, calling it "Another day-late-dollar-short rant".

== Personnel ==
According to author John Blaney, except where noted:

- John Lennon – vocal, slide guitar
- Gary Van Scyoc – bass
- Adam Ippolito – piano, organ
- Richard Frank Jr. – drums, percussion
- Jim Keltner – drums

== Cover versions ==
The American rock band Blind Melon recorded a cover in 1995 that was released on the 1996 compilation album Nico.

== Bibliography ==
- Blaney, John (2005). John Lennon: Listen to this Book. Paper Jukebox. ISBN 978-0-9544528-1-0.
- Blaney, John (2007). Lennon and McCartney, Together Alone: A Critical Discography of Their Solo Work. Jawbone Press. ISBN 978-1-906002-02-2.
- Castleman, Harry; Podrazik, Walter J. (1976). All Together Now: The First Complete Beatles Discography 1961–1975. New York, NY: Ballantine Books. ISBN 0-345-25680-8.
- Doggett, Peter (2005). The Art & Music of John Lennon. Internet Archive. Omnibus Press. ISBN 978-1-84449-954-0.
- Du Noyer, Paul (2010). John Lennon: The Stories Behind Every Song 1970–1980. Internet Archive. Carlton Publishing Group. ISBN 978-1-84732-665-2.
- Harry, Bill (2000). The John Lennon Encyclopedia. Virgin. ISBN 978-0-7535-0404-8.
- Madinger, Chip; Easter, Mark (2018). Eight Arms to Hold You: The Solo Beatles Compendium (Updated ed.). Chesterfield, MO: 44.1 Productions. ISBN 0-615-11724-4.
- Norman, Philip (2008). John Lennon: The Life. New York City, New York: HarperCollins. ISBN 978-0-06-075402-0.
- Rodriguez, Robert (2010). Fab Four FAQ 2.0: The Beatles' Solo Years, 1970–1980. Milwaukee, WI: Backbeat Books. ISBN 978-1-4165-9093-4.
- Sheff, David (2000) [1981]. All We Are Saying: The Last Major Interview with John Lennon and Yoko Ono. New York, NY: St. Martin's Press. ISBN 0-312-25464-4.
