= John Sinclair (physician) =

John Sinclair CBE (1860 – 9 December 1938) was a British physician who served as Chief Medical Officer to the General Post Office from 1913 to 1920.

Sinclair was born in Mancetter, Warwickshire, the son of Edward Sinclair, a Scot from Morayshire. He was educated at Oswestry School and trained as a doctor at the London Hospital. In 1884 he joined the Medical Department of the GPO and was promoted to Second Medical Officer in 1890 and Chief Medical Officer in 1913. He was awarded an honorary Doctor of Medicine (MD) degree by the University of Durham in 1900.

He was appointed Commander of the Order of the British Empire (CBE) in January 1920 for his work in the First World War.

He married Hester Deacon in 1908. He died at Cheltenham in 1938.
