= John Sinclair (sociologist) =

John Sinclair FAHA is a sociologist of international media, communication and culture. Based in Melbourne, Australia, he is acknowledged internationally for his published work on the global television and advertising industries, particularly as they have developed in Latin America and Asia. He also has written on the media use of peoples in diasporic and transnational contexts, and on related processes of consumption and the commercialisation of cultures.

== Career ==
Sinclair completed his PhD on the impact of television advertising in Mexico, investigating the "cultural imperialism" thesis prevalent at the time. His subsequent Images Incorporated of 1987 was one of the first books to take account of the emergent global structure of the advertising industry, analysed as a set of institutional relations between advertisers, advertising agencies, and the media, which he called a "manufacturing-marketing-media complex". The globalisation of television via satellite, challenging hitherto mainly national systems, was the focus of an internationally collaborative and widely cited study of 1996, New Patterns in Global Television: Peripheral Vision. In 1999, Latin American Television: A Global View was published, in which he argued that Latin America and the Spanish-speaking world formed a "geolinguistic region" as an integrated television market, with language as a market force. His further research interest in the use of media by diasporic communities was elaborated in Floating Lives: The Media of Asian Diasporas, published internationally in 2002, with collaborator Stuart Cunningham. Sinclair continued to research in each of these areas, more recent work being published as: Advertising, the Media and Globalisation in 2012; Latin American Television Industries in 2013 (with Joseph D. Straubhaar); Consumer Culture in Latin America (co-edited with Anna Pertierra) in 2012; and Media and Communication in the Chinese Diaspora in 2016 (co-edited with Wanning Sun).

Sinclair retired as an Honorary Professorial Fellow at the University of Melbourne in 2024, and had been formerly an Australian Research Council Professorial Fellow there. In his previous academic career at Victoria University, he co-founded the nation's first BA course in Australian Cultural Studies. He has given guest lectures and held visiting professorships at universities in the United States, Mexico, Venezuela, Portugal, and Spain, where he was UNESCO Professor of Communication in 1999. He was elected a Fellow of the Australian Academy of the Humanities in 2001, and has served as Head of its Cultural and Communication Studies Section. He was awarded the Centenary Medal in 2003 in recognition of his services to the field.

In other professional activities, he has been a member of the editorial advisory board of Media International Australia and other Australian and internationally based journals, and for many years played active roles in the International Association for Media and Communication Research, including the co-founding of the Media and Diasporas Working Group. In 2021, the Association of Iberian and Latin American Studies of Australasia awarded its Lifetime Achievement Award to Sinclair, 'in recognition of his decades of research and leadership in Latin American Studies'.

== Monographs ==
- 1987 – Images Incorporated: Advertising as Industry and Ideology, Croom Helm, London.
- 1999 – Latin American Television: A Global View, Oxford University Press, Oxford & New York.
- 2000 – Televisión: Comunicación Global y Regionalización, Editorial Gedisa, Barcelona.
- 2012 – Advertising, the Media and Globalisation: A World in Motion, Routledge, London & New York.
- 2013 – Latin American Television Industries, British Film Institute/Palgrave Macmillan, London. With Joseph D. Straubhaar.

== Co-edited works ==
- 1996 – New Patterns in Global Television: Peripheral Vision, Oxford University Press, Oxford & New York. Co-edited with Elizabeth Jacka and Stuart Cunningham.
- 2001 – Floating Lives: The Media of Asian Diasporas, Rowman & Littlefield, Lanham, Maryland Co-written and edited with Stuart Cunningham.
- 2004 – Contemporary World Television, British Film Institute, London. With Graeme Turner, associate editor.
- 2012 – Consumer Culture in Latin America, Palgrave Macmillan, New York. Co-edited with Anna Pertierra.
- 2016 – Media and Communication in the Chinese Diaspora: Rethinking Transnationalism, Routledge, London & New York. Co-edited with Wanning Sun.
