= Coventry city walls =

Defensive walls in Coventry in England

- Coventry, West Midlands
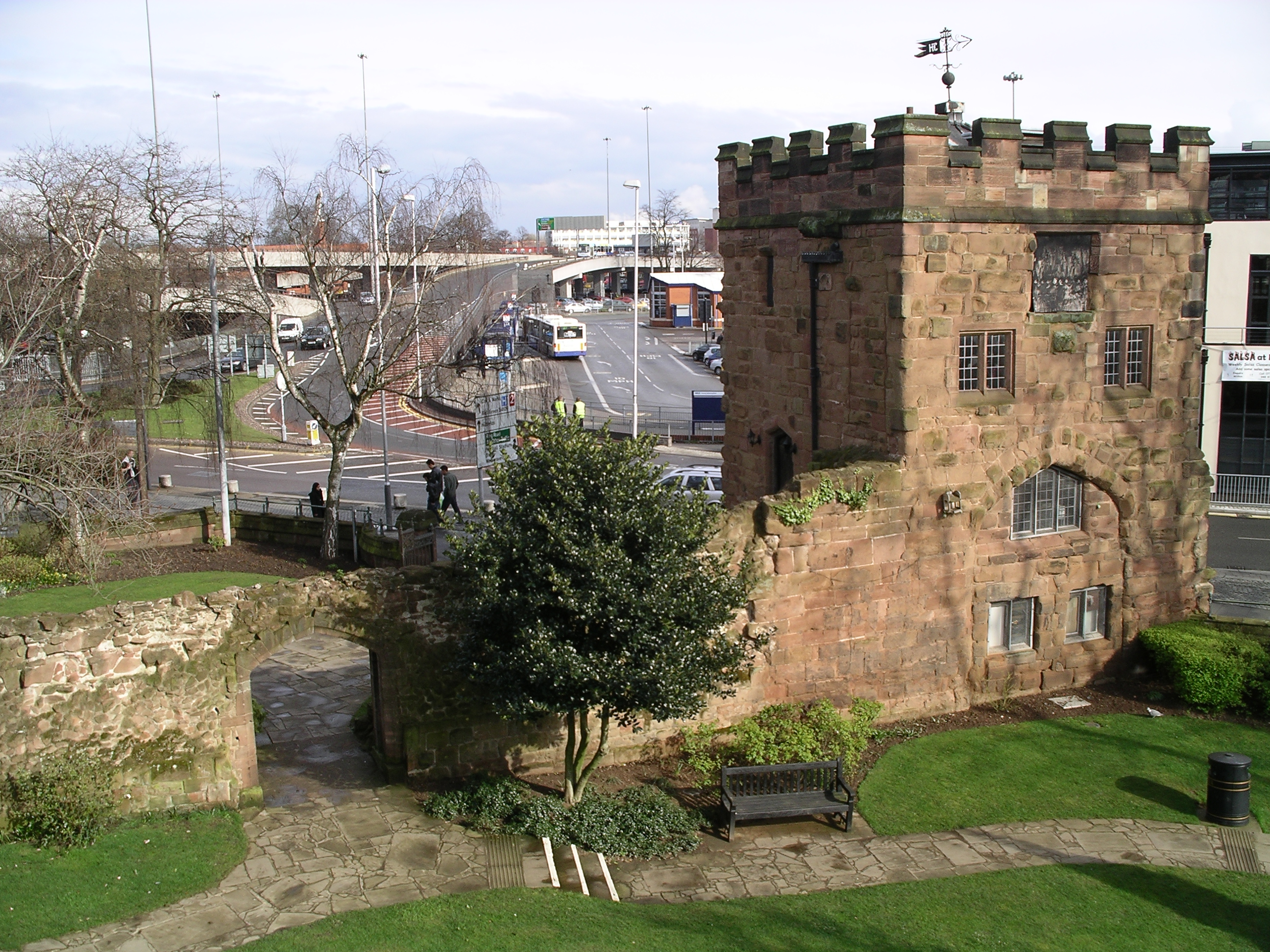
- Swanswell Gate

Site information
- Type: City wall

Location
- Shown within the West Midlands
- Coordinates: 52.4109°N 1.5079°W
- Grid reference: grid reference SP335793

Site history
- Materials: Sandstone

Coventry's city walls are a sequence of defensive structures built around the city of Coventry in England.

== History ==
The city of Coventry was not walled until the 14th century; by the beginning of the 13th century the city was surrounded by ditches and had movable "bars" controlling access to the main routes in and out the city, but there were no proper defensive walls. Reflecting Coventry's commercial and strategic importance, construction began on new city walls in the 1350s, with the mayor of Coventry, Richard Stoke, recorded as laying the first stone in 1356. The construction effort started at New Gate and was initially finished in around 1400, but much repair work and re-routing was subsequently carried out to accommodate the expanding city and the walls were not finally completed until 1534.

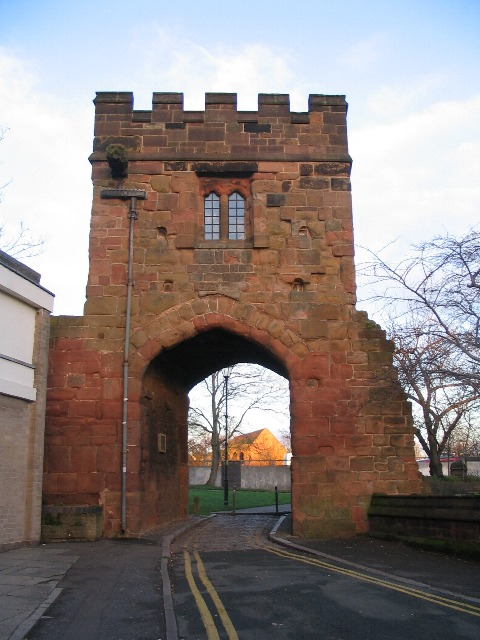
Cook Street Gate

The walls measured nearly 2.2 miles (3.5 km) around and consisting of two red sandstone walls infilled with rubble over 8 feet (2.4 m) thick and 12 feet (3.7 m) high, with 32 towers including 12 gatehouses. The twelve city gates were titled New Gate, Gosford Gate, Bastille Gate (later Mill Gate), Priory Gate (Swanswell Gate), Cook Street Gate, Bishop Gate, Well Street Gate, Hill Street Gate, Spon Gate, Greyfriars Gate, Cheylesmore Gate and Little Park Street Gate.

The building work was paid for by murage, by which the king allowed a city to raise taxes on the imports of particular goods, and assisted by King Richard II allowing stone to be quarried from his park in Cheylesmore. Later, some towers along the wall were let to private citizens, on the condition that they assisted in maintaining stretches of the defences. Watchmen for the walls and gates were provided by dividing Coventry into ten wards, each of which had the task of providing a number of men on a rotating basis.

With its walls, Coventry was described as being the best-defended city in England outside London. The city of Coventry faced few military threats, however, and the decision to build the walls appears to have been driven by political and economic drivers - walls were important symbolically to a city's leading citizens and in turn could bring additional trade. The decision to build the walls in the 1350s appears to be linked to the "Tripartite Indenture" of Coventry in 1355, which established a common local government for the city.

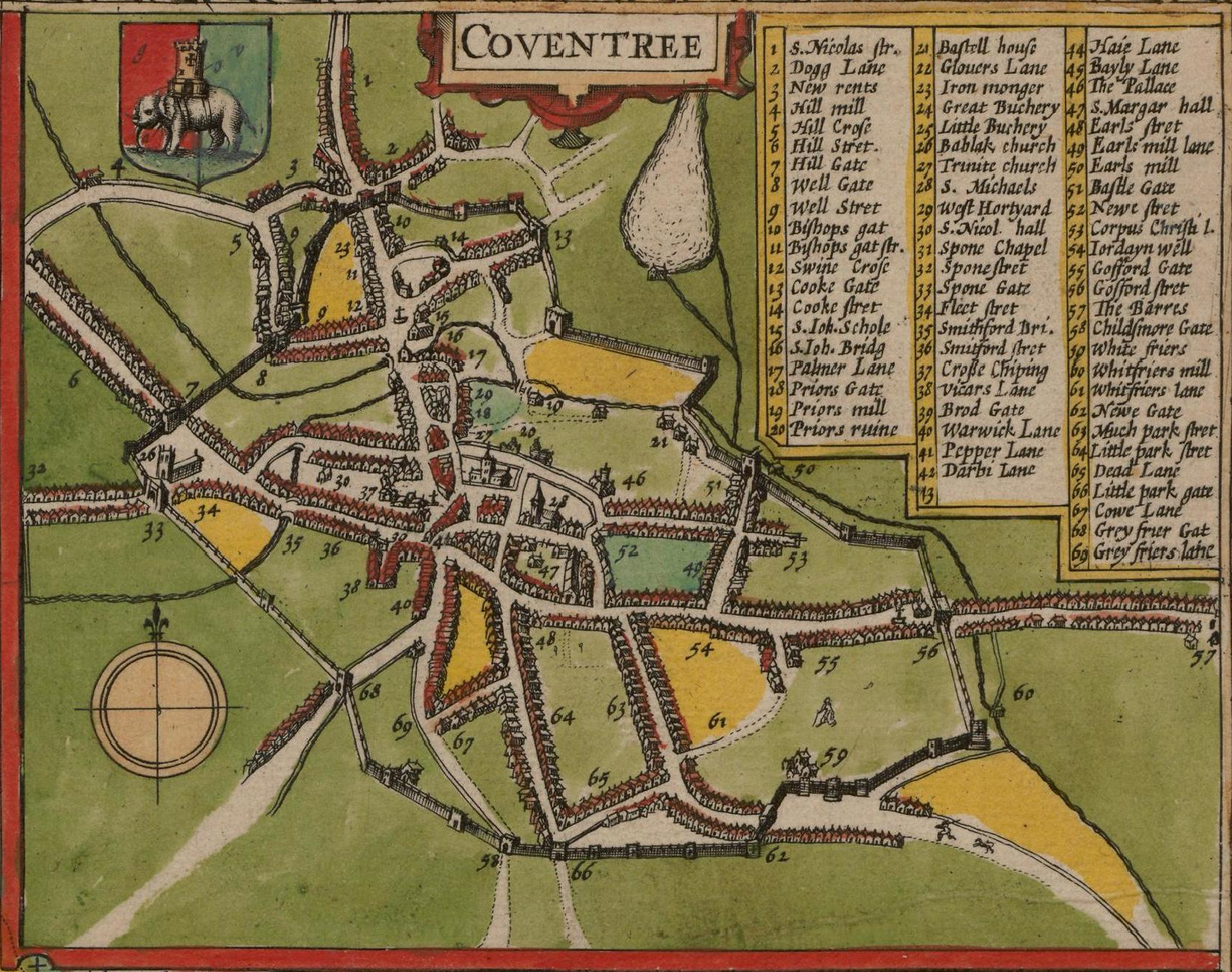
Map of Coventry by John Speed from 1610, showing the city walls

=== Civil War and aftermath ===
The only time the walls were tested militarily were during a two day siege in August 1642 during the English Civil War. It started on 19 August when the Royalist forces led by King Charles I attempted to lay siege to the city which had declared for Parliament. There are several versions of the events; one is that the king's artillery made little damage to the walls, the other is that a breach was made in the walls, and the king's forces were met by the cityfolk who poured out of the breach in fighting array and engaged in battle. In any event the siege ended in failure when the king's forces learned that Lord Brooke and General John Hampden were approaching Coventry with a force of 4,800 men. This news caused them to retreat.

In 1662, after the restoration of the monarchy, in revenge for the support Coventry gave to the Parliamentarians during the Civil War, the city walls were demolished on the orders of King Charles II.

== Remains ==
In the 21st century only two of the medieval gates survive - Swanswell Gate and Cook Street Gate - and some small sections of walling. The remaining wall circuit is protected as a Grade I listed building and a scheduled monument.

== See also ==
- Scheduled Ancient Monuments in Coventry
- Grade I listed buildings in Coventry
- List of town walls in England and Wales

== Bibliography ==
- Creighton, Oliver Hamilton and Robert Higham. (2005) Medieval Town Walls: an Archaeology and Social History of Urban Defence. Stroud, UK: Tempus. ISBN 978-0-7524-1445-4.
- Fox, Levi. (1957) Coventry's Heritage. Birmingham, UK: Coventry Evening Telegraph. OCLC 9009042.
- Walters, Peter (2019). The Little History of Coventry. History Press Limited. ISBN 978-0-7509-8908-4.
