= Cook Street Gate =

Gate in Coventry, England

Coordinates: 52.412011°N 1.508411°W

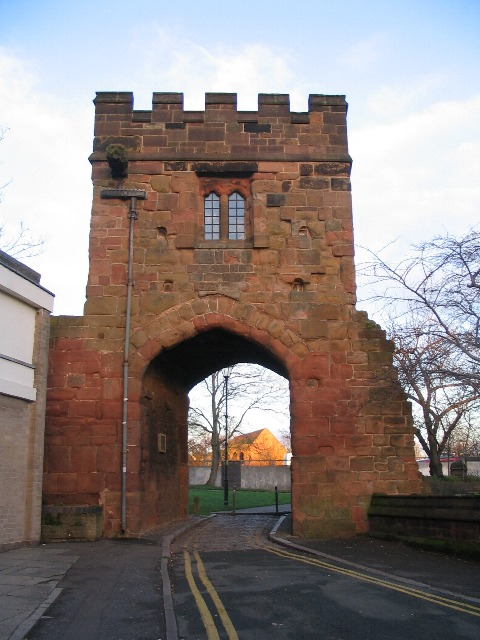
Cook Street Gate, seen in 2008

Cook Street Gate is a medieval gate in Coventry, England. It was probably built in the second half of the 14th century as part of the defensive circuit of the city.

This gate is one of only two which survive of the original twelve town gates and the only one through which a road still runs. The other is Swanswell Gate. It was completed around 1485 AD but was derelict by the late 19th century. The gate was presented to the city in 1913 by Sir William Wyley and restored in 1918. The blocked doorways onto the wall walk can still be seen and as of May 2021 there is a planning application to renovate and conserve the building and open it up as tourist accommodation. The site is one of ten Scheduled Monuments in Coventry and a Grade I Listed Building. It was previously owned by Coventry City Council but has been transferred to Historic Coventry Trust to maintain and run.
