= Whitefriars, Coventry =

Whitefriars
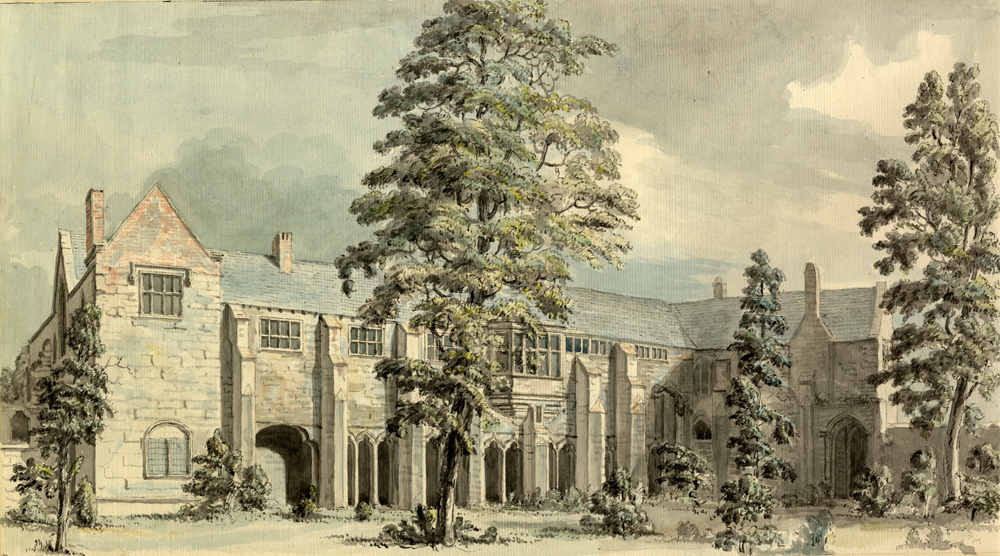
- Whitefriars c. 1776, as painted by Moses Griffith.
- Interactive map of the Whitefriars area

General information
- Type: Friary
- Location: Coventry, England
- Coordinates: 52.40502°N 1.50148°W
- Current tenants: Herbert Art Gallery and Museum
- Opened: 14 February 1342
- Renovated: 1965
- Owner: Coventry City Council

Technical details
- Floor count: 2

The buildings known as Whitefriars are the surviving fragments of a Carmelite friary founded in 1342 in Coventry, England. It was initially home to a friary until the dissolution of the monasteries. During the 16th century it was owned by John Hales and served as King Henry VIII School, Coventry, before the school moved to St John's Hospital, Coventry. It was home to a workhouse during the 19th century. The buildings are currently used by Herbert Art Gallery and Museum, Coventry.

All that remains of the friary buildings are the eastern cloister walk, a postern gateway in Much Park Street (used as a toy museum until 2008) and the foundations of the friary church. The cloister walk that survives would have been one of four when the friary was in use and is constructed from red sandstone. The wooden roof of the building is not an original but thought to have been brought from a nearby building during the 16th century.

Various institutions in Coventry are named after the friary such as Whitefriars Ale House and Whitefriars Housing Group.

== History ==
=== Establishment ===
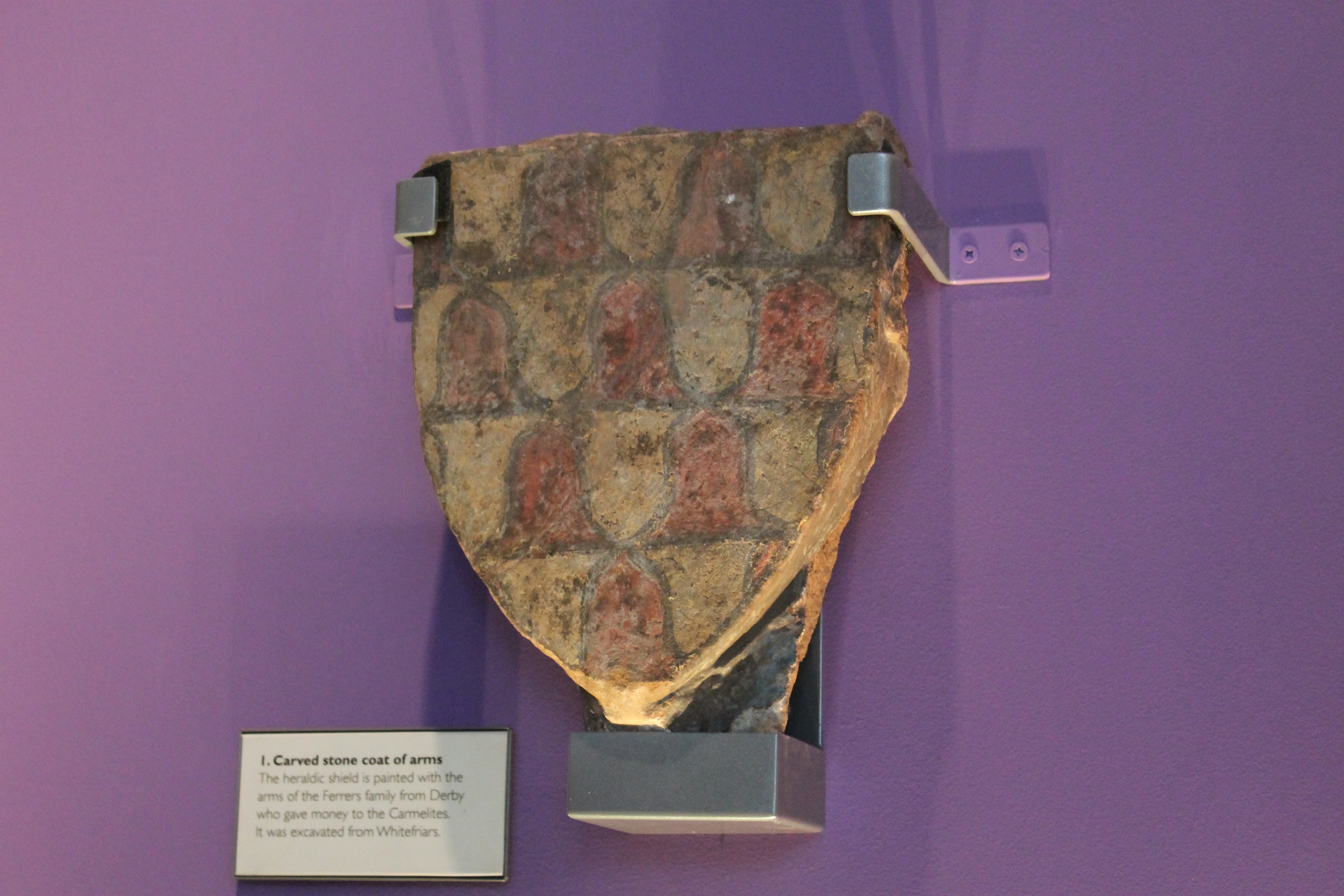
A carved stone heraldic shield painted with the coat of arms of the Ferrers family from Derby, excavated from Whitefriars

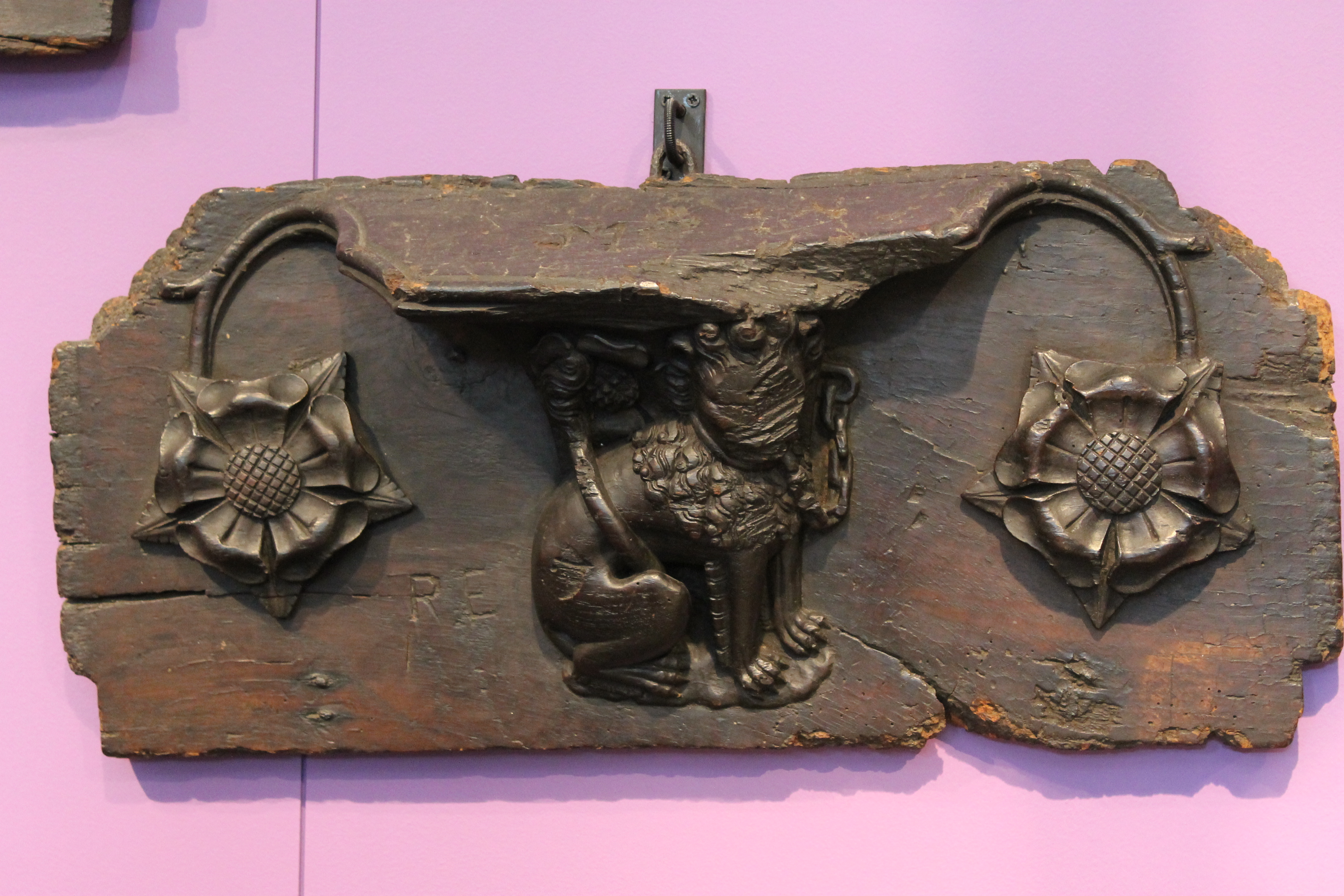
A misericord from Whitefriars, on display at Herbert Art Gallery and Museum

The friary was established on 14 February 1342 with the help of Sir John Poultney, about a century after the Carmelites arrived in England. It was built on land that had previously been fields and orchards. The Carmelites were a mendicant religious order, dependent on charity from those they taught and on the gifts from pilgrims visiting their shrine of Our Lady of the Tower. According to Dugdale, 'This Chapell is in the tower of the Cittye Wall without New Gate, close by the roadway leading towards London. On the outside thereof was a picture of the blessed Virgin, richly painted, and within an image and her altar, whereat most travellers which passed by did offer more or lesse, out of confidence that their journey would be better blest'. In 1344, King Edward III gave land to extend these buildings and a similar grant followed in 1352. Several local benefactors left donations in the form of bequests to the friary: in 1384 Lord Basset of Drayton left the Carmelites £300 to enlarge the church, in 1419 the monastery was considerable enlarged with a gift from William Botener, of Withibroke and in 1506 Thomas Bonde of Coventry left them 20 marks to assist with the rebuilding of the cloisters. The coat of arms of the Ferrers family (Earls of Derby) was found during excavations of the church, suggesting that the family had also made bequests to the order. Carmelite orders were dependent on such donations to build their friaries and the Coventry house was clearly developed through a process of gradual building and enlargement as and when funds became available.

The church, dedicated to the Virgin Mary, was one of the longest friary churches in England and was one of the first buildings on the site. The church was, like the rest of the site, built from red sandstone blocks and the interior was painted white with decorative stonework. The floor was covered with locally made patterned clay tiles. In the choir, the wooden seats and misericords were finely carved and some of these survived but were later removed to the Old Grammar School in Hales Street.

=== Tudor period ===
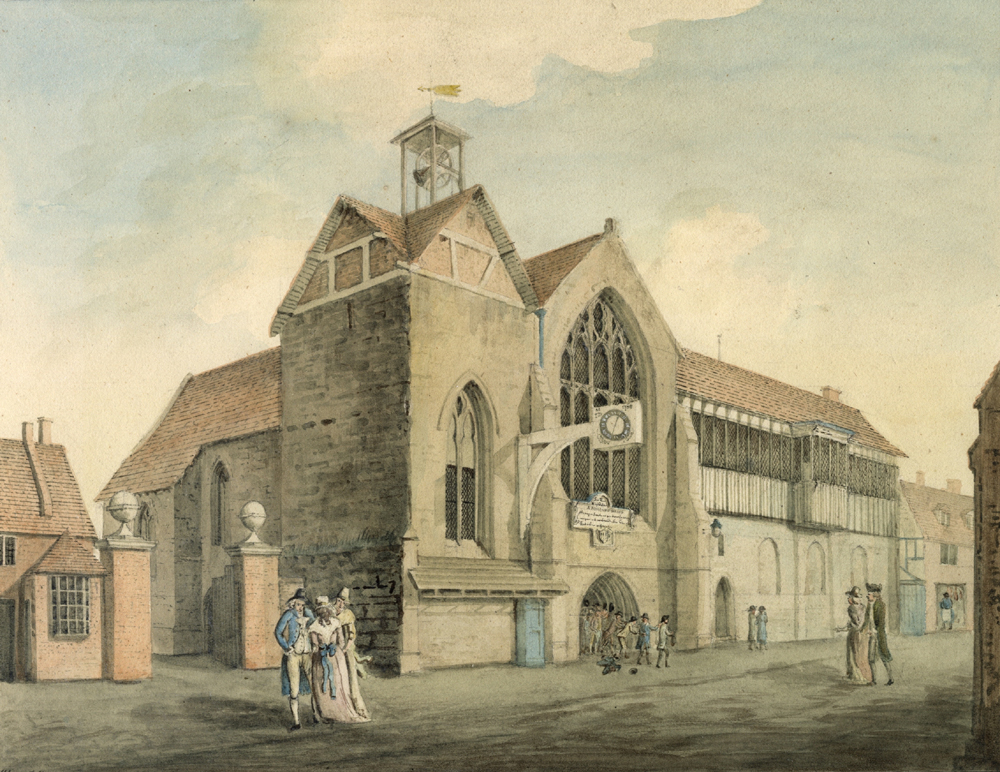
The Hospital of St. John the Baptist – the site of King Henry VIII School after 1558.

Whitefriars was closed on 1 October 1538 as part of Henry VIII's dissolution of the monasteries in England, with the 14 remaining friars signing the instrument of surrender. The crown granted the friary to Sir Ralph Sadler in 1544, who sold it to John Hales, who had bought much of the former monastic property in Coventry. Hales demolished parts of it, converted part of the cloister into a residence, calling it Hales Place, and the chancel of the church into a grammar school, using the choir stalls as seating for the boys. The church and churchyard were purchased by George Pollard and Andrew Flammock who subsequently sold it to the Coventry Corporation in 1543.

In 1545, John Hales started King Henry VIII School, Coventry, a free grammar school, in the choir stalls of the Whitefriars church. He ran it at his own expense, paying the school master a then-exorbitant wage of £30p/a.

During the reign of Queen Mary (1553–1558), Hales, who was a Protestant went into religious exile in Frankfurt, Germany. In his absence, the Coventry Corporation moved the school from Whitefriars church to the Hospital of St. John the Baptist and claimed the church as a parish church.

The friary was also used to house a puritan printing press during Hales' spell abroad and despite his apparent ignorance of the matter, he was heavily fined.

==== Elizabethan period ====
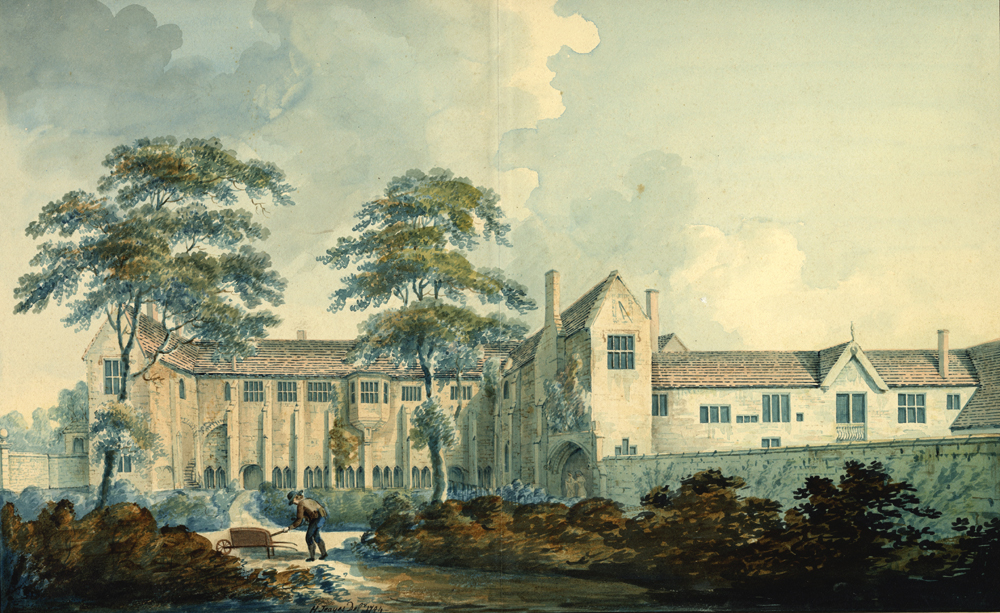
The Whitefriars buildings in 1794.

In August 1565, on a state tour around her realm, Queen Elizabeth I made her one and only visit to Coventry, staying for two days at Whitefriars with John Hales, during which time she described it as a "fine house". Between 25 November 1569 and 2 January 1570, Mary Queen of Scots was held in Coventry on Elizabeth's orders, spending part of this time in Whitefriars.

Following John Hales' death on 5 January 1572, his estates passed to his nephew John Hales II. The Hales family moved to a newly built property elsewhere in Coventry, named "New House", and let Whitefriars to Lord Henry Berkeley of Caludon Castle.

=== Victorian era onward ===
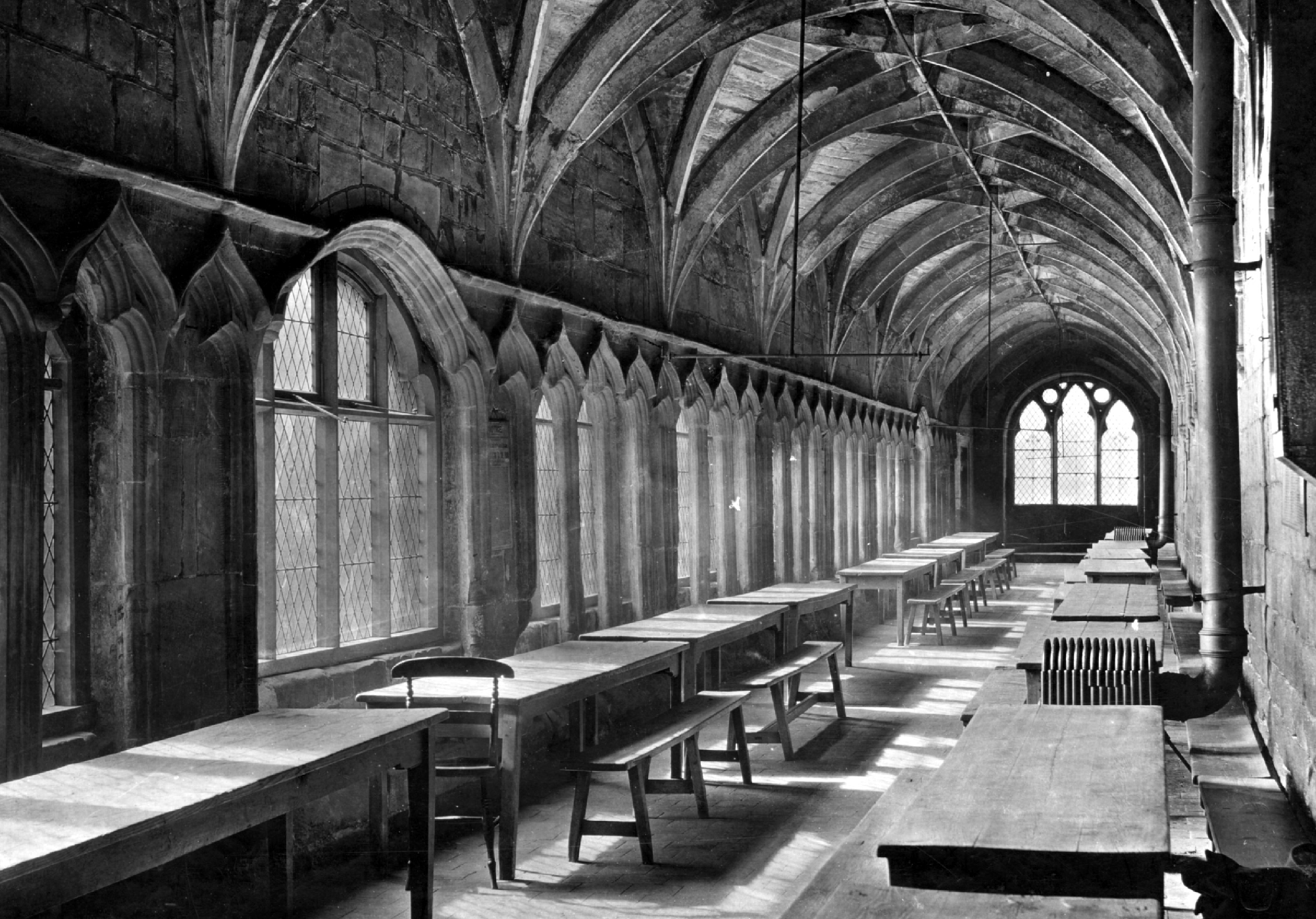
The cloisters of Whitefriars, during its use as a workhouse in the 1800s.

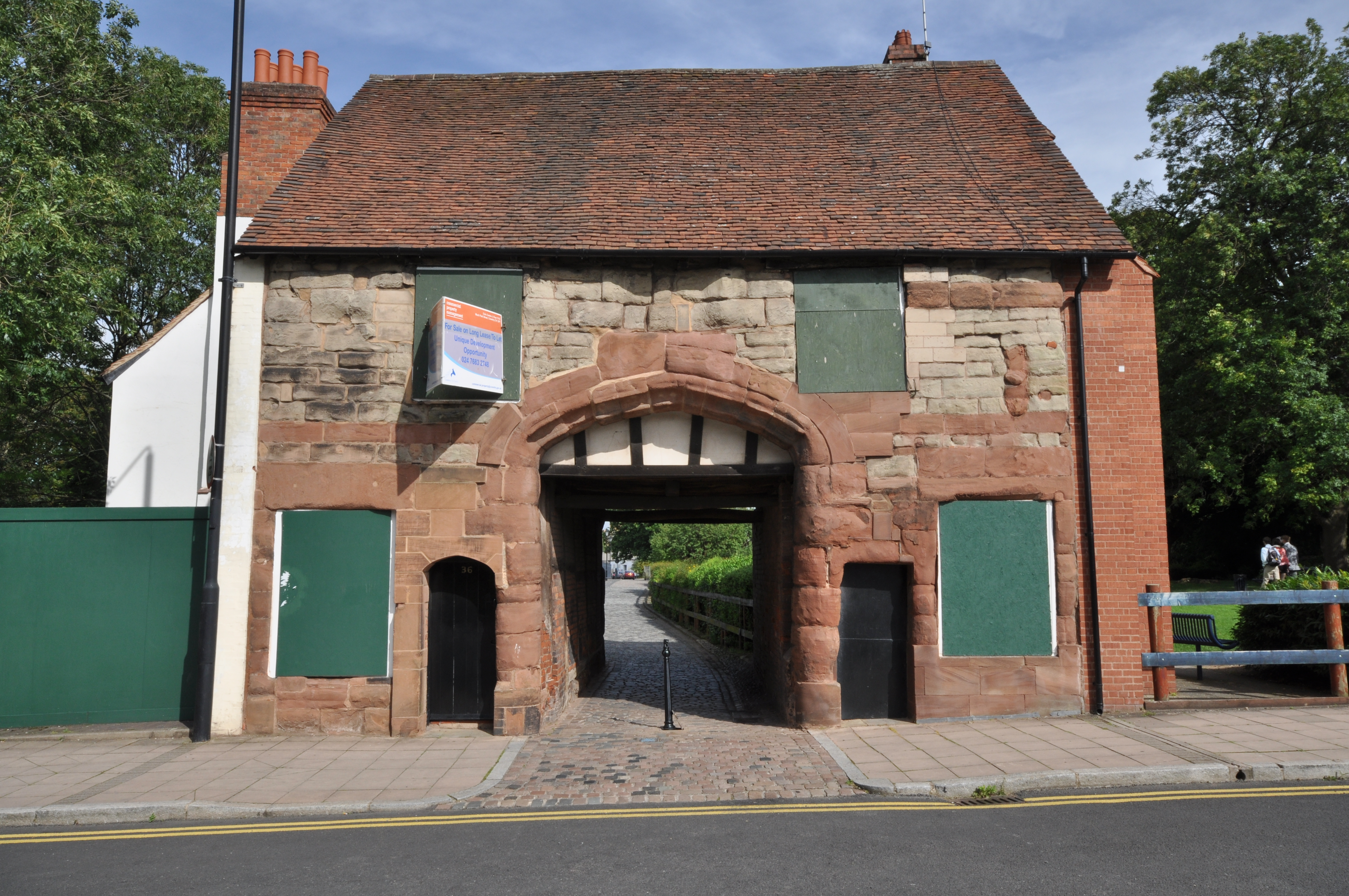
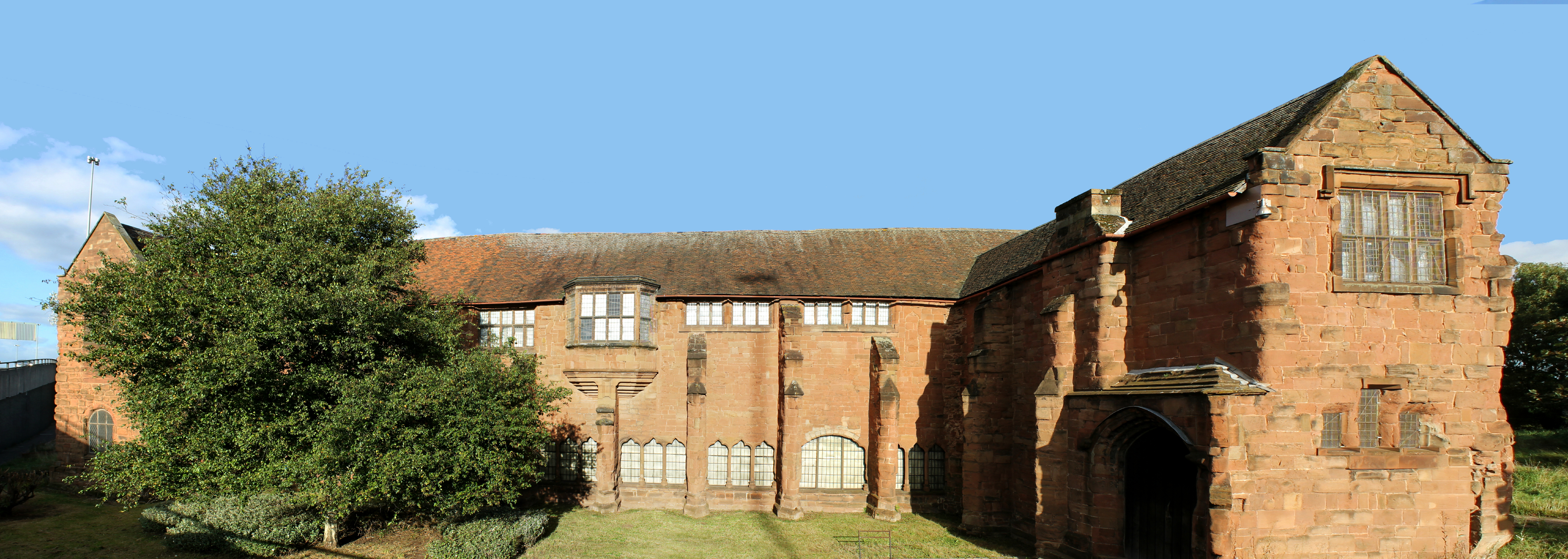
All that remains of Whitefriars today is the gateway on Much Park Street and the Cloister wing, outside the Coventry ring road.

The residence passed through several owners before being sold to the Board of Directors of the Poor in 1801 and converted to a workhouse. Inmates worked 12 hours a day in winter and 13 during the Summer with only half an hour for breakfast and an hour set aside for lunch. Young children were given a basic education in the workhouse school and in 1906, a children's block was added to the building.

The cloister building was damaged during a bombing raid in 1940. In 1948 it became a Salvation Army hostel. Following extensive restoration in 1965 it was opened in 1970 as "Whitefriars Museum". The dormitory was used as an exhibition hall which was home to a small display relating to the building's history: its use as a Friary, private town house and workhouse. The gallery also held a changing exhibition of sculpture. The museum closed in the early 1990s due to spending cuts.

The building is currently owned by Herbert Art Gallery and Museum and is not open to the public, apart from on Heritage Open Days.

In 1973, Whitefriars Gate which stands several hundred metres from the rest of the remaining building, was bought by Ron Morgan who used it as Coventry Toy Museum. It was closed in 2008 following his death. In 2009, it was targeted by arsonists and the roof and floors in the back were damaged although it still stands.

Whitefriars Gate on Much Park Street and the cloister wing, outside Coventry ring road, are all that remain of the 14th century monastery.

== Architecture ==
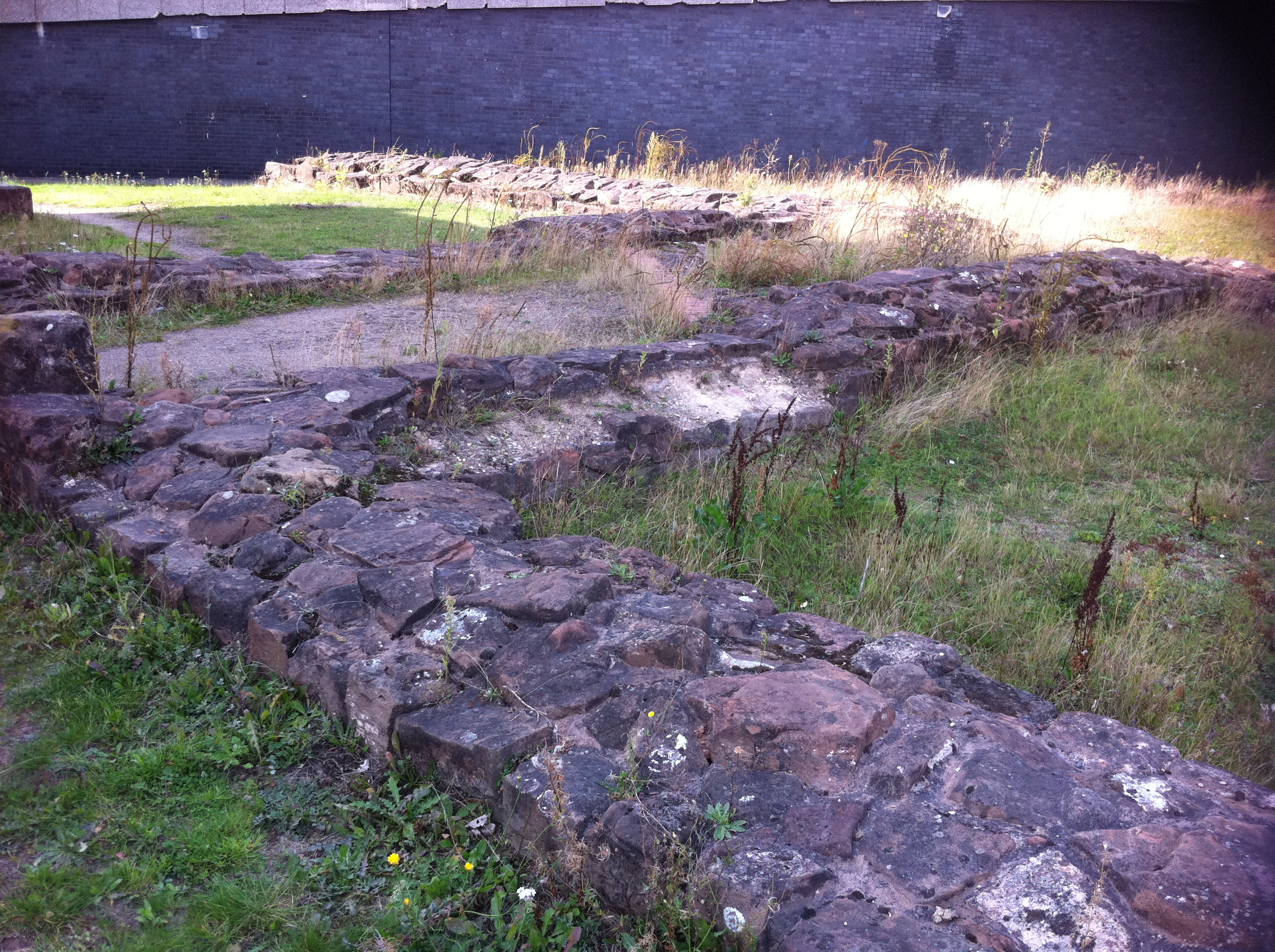
The foundations of the friary church are all that remain of it.

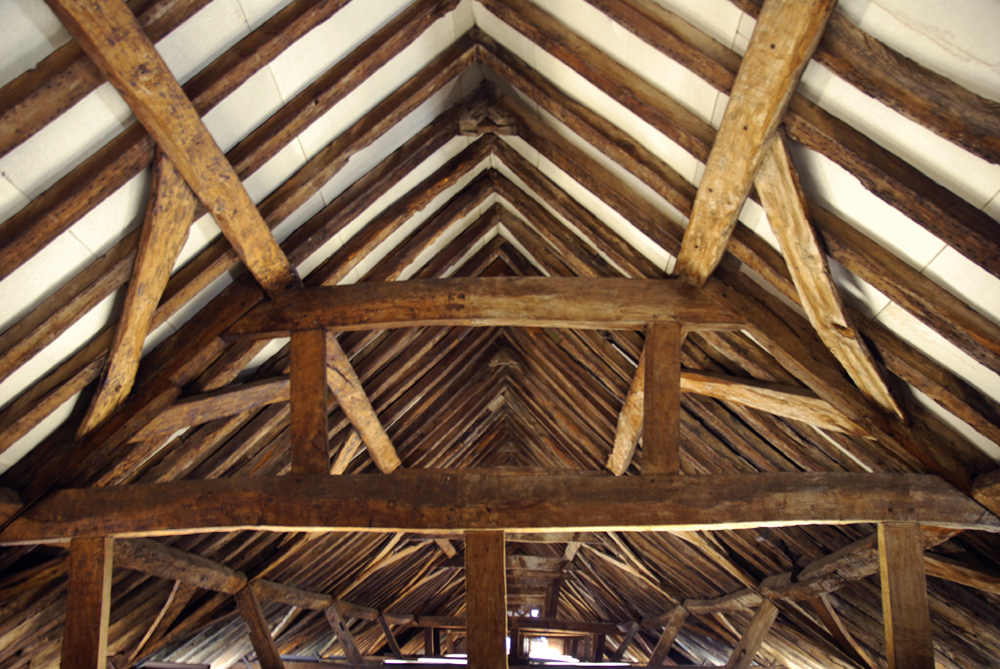
The timber roof of the dormitory of the Whitefriars cloister building.

At the founding of the house in 1342, Whitefriars occupied a site of 10 acres (4 ha) in the south east of Coventry. The western approach was made from Much Park Street where an outer gate still stands. The cloister building was constructed from red sandstone.

The remaining cloister walk (the eastern cloister range) would have been one of four, which originally formed a continuous quadrangle. The cloister which remains is relatively unchanged from how it would have been when it was constructed. The windows would originally have had no bars and looked out onto a garden or lawn. Marks along one wall still remain where wooden benches and tables were affixed to it in the 19th century, when the building was a workhouse.

Accessible from an opening halfway along the cloister walk is the chapter house vestibule. There was once an entrance arch which extended back 50 ft (15 m). The window in the chapter house is re-used from elsewhere in the friary following its demolition. On each side of the vestibule is a room: the "friars' warming room" which had a fireplace and their parlour which would have been used for meeting and talking. During the building's time as a workhouse it served as a chapel.

The dormitory is located on the upper floor and is where the friars would have worked and slept. At the north end is the night stair which would have led down to the church, which is now demolished. A blocked-up doorway in the opposite wall led to a room above the vestry, the foundations of which are visible outside the building.

Following John Hales' purchase of Whitefriars in 1544, he added a fireplace and the "Oriel window" to the dormitory. It was in this room that Elizabeth I was entertained during her visit in the 1560s.

The windows and ceilings in the cloister and chapter house are fine examples of mediaeval stonework. The rib-vaulted ceiling is constructed from stone ribs filled in with stone blocks. There are decorative carved faces along the cloister where the vaulting ribs emerge from the walls.

The timber roof of the building is thought not to be the original. It is 16th century and locally made. It is likely that it was taken from another, similar building also bought by John Hales after the Dissolution of the Monasteries.

== Local influence ==
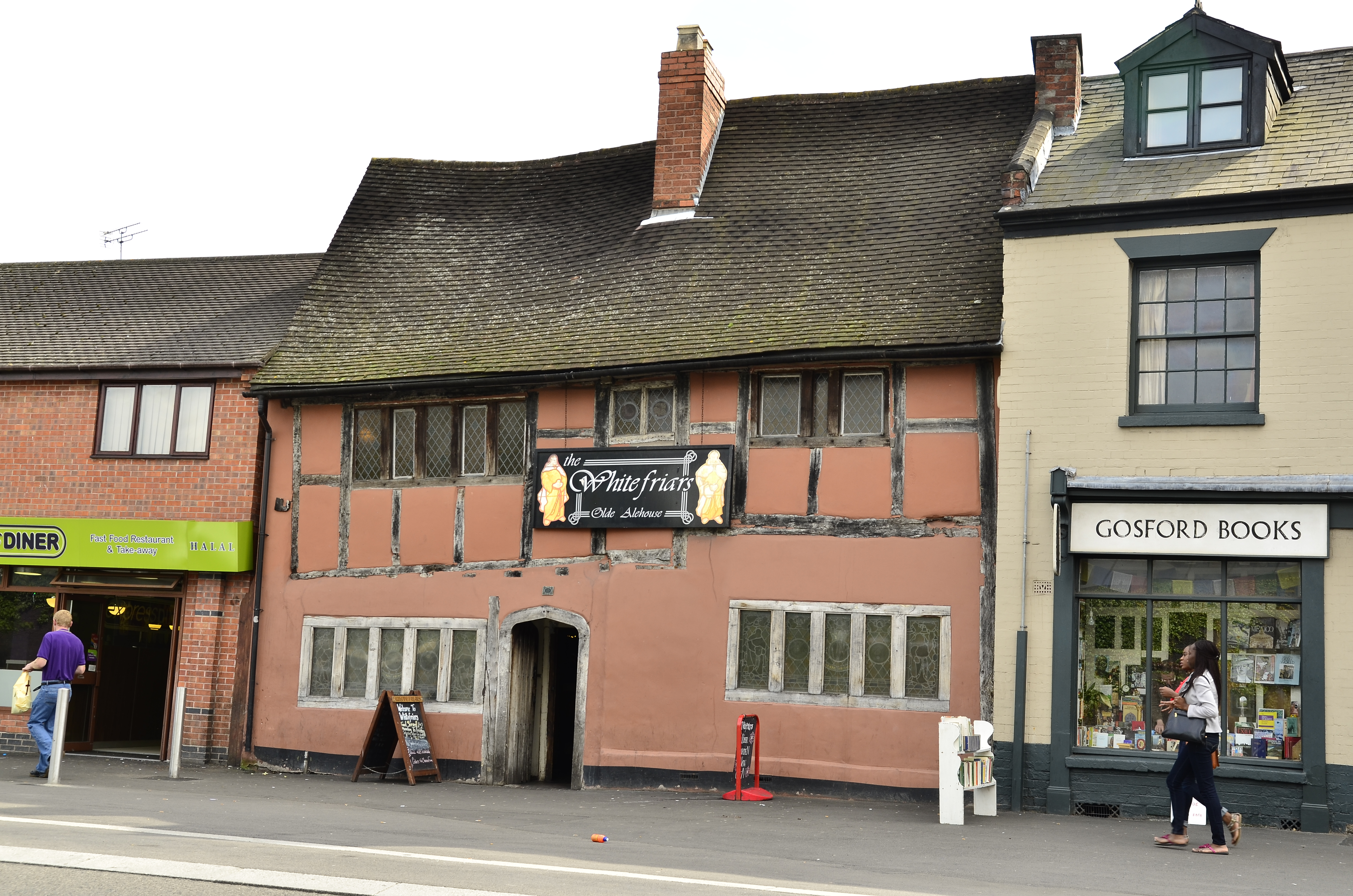
Whitefriars ale house in Coventry

Like the Greyfriars monastery in Coventry, Whitefriars is the namesake of local places and companies. The Grade II listed Whitefriars Ale House was named for the monastery, having been within its boundaries. It is adjacent to Whitefriars Lane which runs through Whitefriars Gate.

The Whitefriars Housing Group which is based in Coventry was also named after the friary.

== See also ==
- Grade I listed buildings in Coventry
- Grade II* listed buildings in Coventry (Whitefriars Gate)

== Bibliography ==
- Poole, Benjamin (1852). The history of Coventry. Coventry.
- Stephens, W.B. (editor) (1969). A History of the County of Warwick: Volume 8: The City of Coventry and Borough of Warwick. Victoria Country History.
- Storer, James Andrew (1818). The antiquarian and topographical cabinet. Vol. 5. London: J. Murray.
- Woodfield, Charmian (July–August 2007). "The White Friars of Coventry". Current Archaeology. 18, No.6 (210): 9–16.
- Woodhouse, Frederick (2004). The Churches of Coventry. Kessinger Publishing. ISBN 1419156748.
