= 38–39 Bayley Lane =

Remains of building in Coventry, England

Coordinates: 52.40779°N 1.50812°W

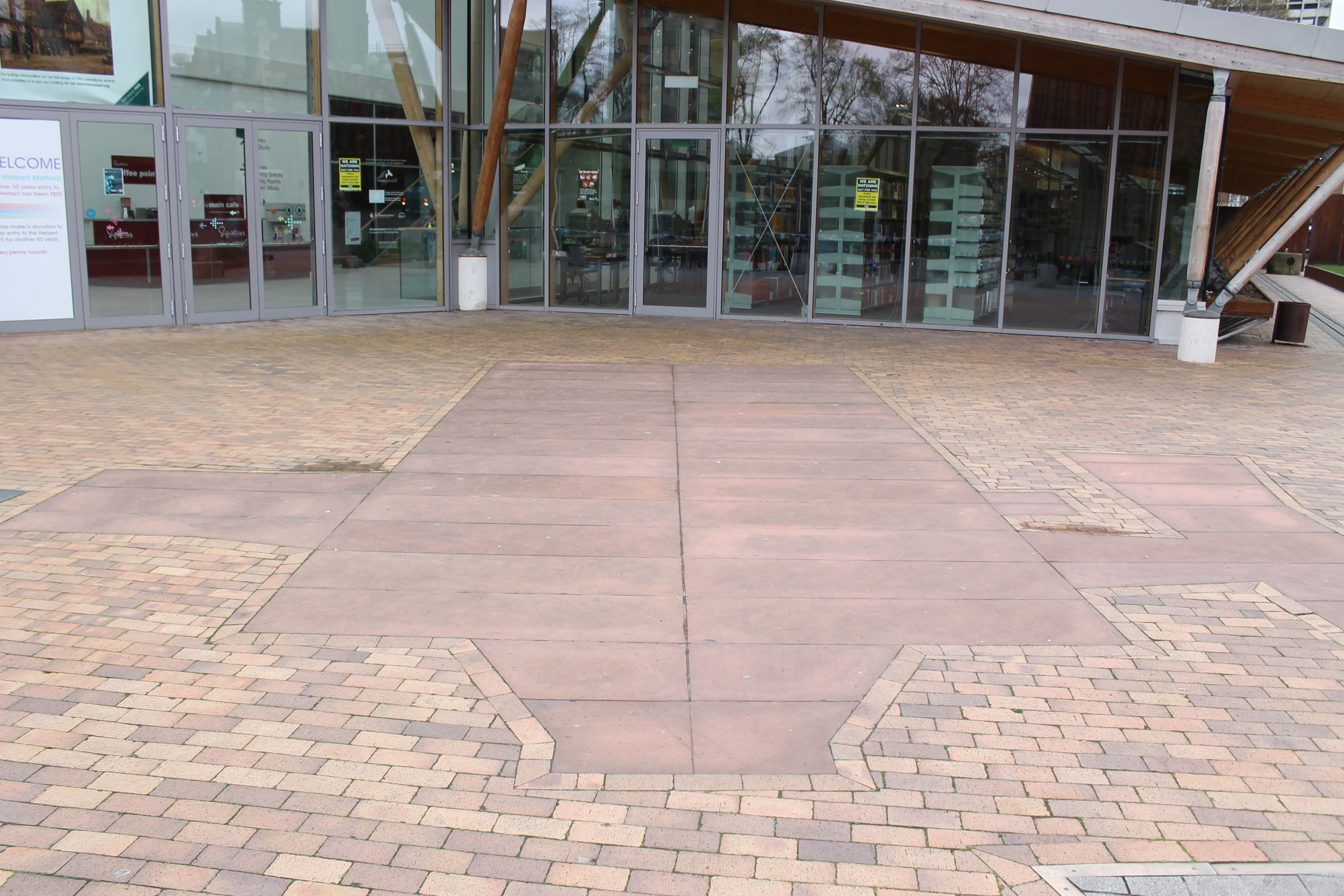
- The area of the undercroft is outlined on the ground above.
- Interactive map of the 38–39 Bayley Lane area

General information
- Status: Destroyed
- Location: Bayley Lane, Coventry, United Kingdom
- Completed: 14th century
- Owner: Herbert Art Gallery and Museum

Listed Building – Grade I
- Official name: MEDIEVAL BASEMENT BELOW NUMBERS 38 AND 39
- Designated: 5 February 1955
- Reference no.: 1116387

38–39 Bayley Lane is a former building, whose present-day site is accessible from the Herbert Art Gallery and Museum in Coventry, England. All that remains is the medieval undercroft, a fourteenth-century cellar that initially belonged to a wealthy merchant, who was a clothier. The undercroft is built with sandstone with a stone-ribbed vault for added security and strength. It is a Grade I listed building.

== History ==
The area of Bayley Lane that the building was located in was occupied by wealthy merchants in the late medieval period. Following the earlier levelling of Coventry Castle, the area would have been undeveloped. Bayley Lane likely emerged as a route through the former castle bailey or outer court.

The status of the area grew after the establishment of St Mary's Guildhall, followed by the construction of Drapers Hall.

The property belonged to the Benedictine Priory and the earliest-known tenant was Robert Allesley, a girdler.

== Undercroft ==
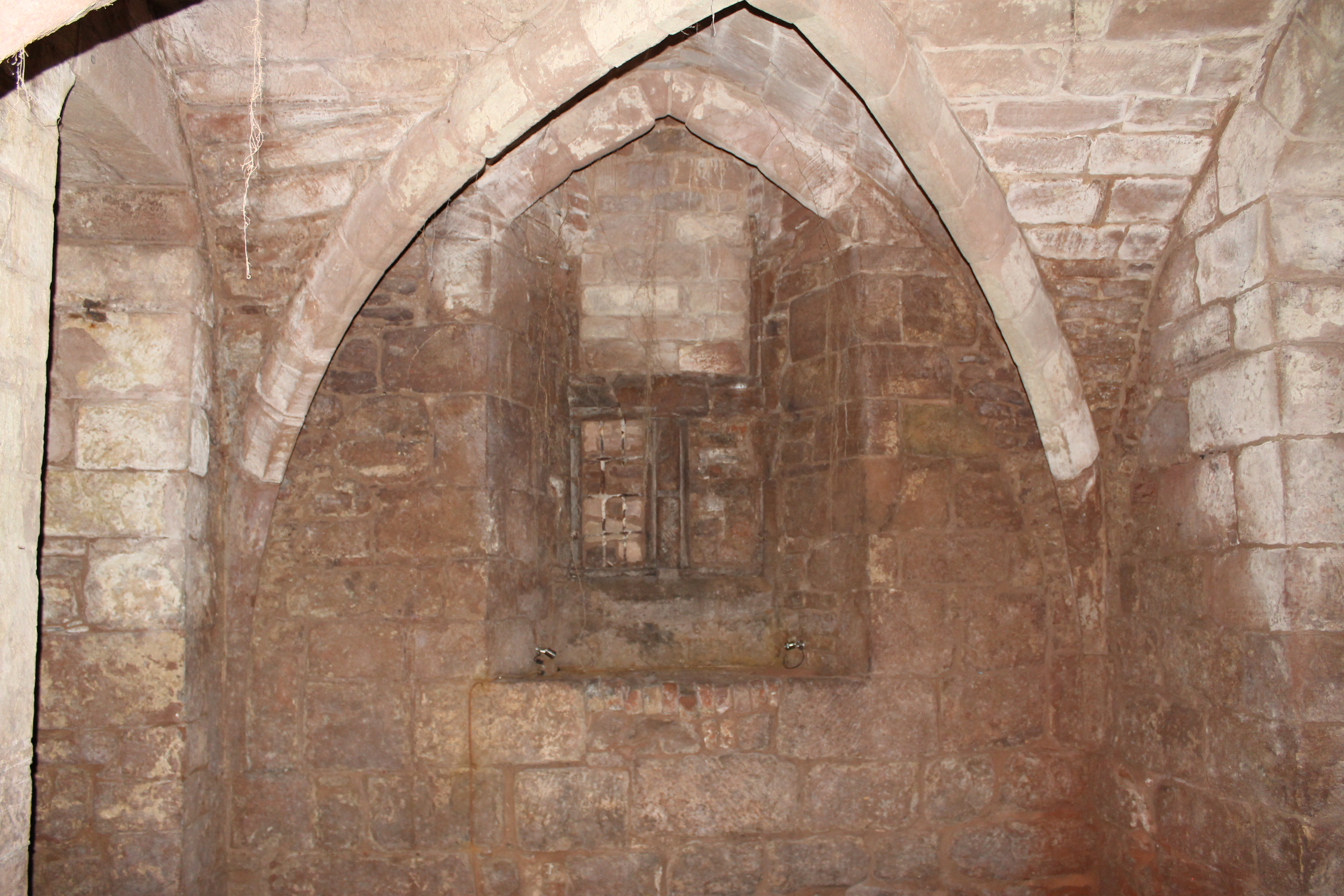
Looking towards the window in the north wall of the undercroft.

The cellar of 38–39 Bayley Lane is much smaller than the similar undercroft beneath St Mary's Guildhall, further along Bayley Lane which is used as a restaurant.

The undercroft consists of two square bays making a rectangular room (just over 21 by 11 feet (6.4 by 3.4 m)). There are two separate entrances, one by which the cellar is entered from Herbert Art Gallery and Museum in the west and another, which is blocked after a few steps, in the east. There are niches in the western and southern walls which were used to store valuable goods.

The local topography allowed the cellar to be lit on the northern side with a window.

== See also ==
- Grade I listed buildings in Coventry
- 21–22 High Street, Coventry
