= Grade I listed buildings in Coventry =

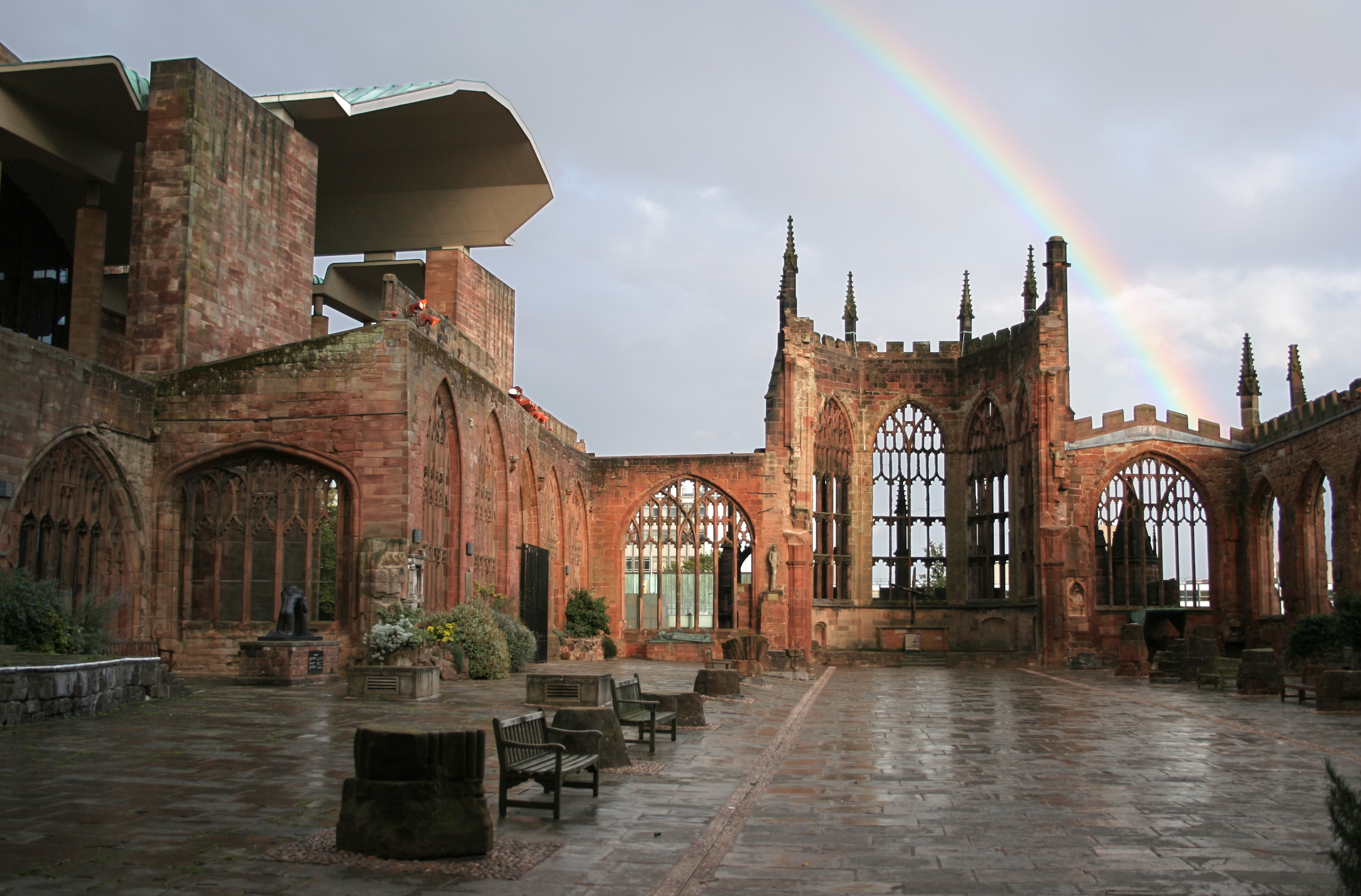
The Cathedral Church of St Michael was almost completely destroyed in the Coventry Blitz of 1940; its ruins are now a Grade I listed building.

There are 20 Grade I listed buildings in Coventry, an ancient city and a metropolitan borough in the West Midlands of England.

The city's history dates back to at least the 11th century (CE), and by the 14th century, it was a thriving centre of commerce. Like many of Coventry's Grade I listed buildings, the city's walls were erected towards the end of the 14th and the beginning of the 15th centuries. Of the 20 buildings on this list, 14 are in the city centre, and 11 date back to the 14th century. The oldest is St. Mary's Priory and cathedral, now a ruin, which was founded in 1043. Several other buildings in this list date from the 12th century. The youngest Grade I listed building in the city is the new cathedral, built in the 1950s to replace the city's second cathedral which was built in the 14th century and elevated to cathedral status in 1918. Like much of the city centre, the city's second cathedral was almost completely destroyed in the Coventry Blitz in November 1940, and the new cathedral was built next to the ruin, which was preserved. A 20th building, Coombe Abbey, in Coombe Country Park (SP 40351 79757) is owned by Coventry City Council but falls just outside the city boundary and into the Borough of Rugby in Warwickshire and thus is not included in this list.

== List of buildings ==
Name	Location	Type	Completed (Note: The date given is the date used by Historic England as significant for the initial building or that of an important part in the structure's description.)	Date designated	Grid ref. (Note: The grid reference is based on the British national grid reference system, sometimes known as OSGB36, used by the Ordnance Survey.) Geo-coordinates	Notes	Entry number (Note: The "List Entry Number" is a unique number assigned to each listed building and scheduled monument by Historic England.)	Image
38–39 Bayley Lane, medieval basement	Bayley Lane, City Centre	Building	14th century	5 February 1955	SP3366178962; 52°24′27″N 1°30′24″W	Numbers 38 and 39 no longer exist, but the mediaeval stone undercroft on the site remains. Accessible from the Herbert Art Gallery and Museum.	1116387	38–39 Bayley Lane, medieval basement More images
St Mary's Hall	Bayley Lane, City Centre	Guildhall	14th century	5 February 1955	SP3357678957; 52°24′27″N 1°30′28″W	Mediaeval guildhall that has functioned as a meeting place for various groups since the 14th century. Once the prison of Mary, Queen of Scots. (Note: St Mary's Hall was formerly a scheduled monument.)	1116402	St Mary's Hall More images
Ruined cathedral	Bayley Lane/St Michael's Avenue, City Centre	Cathedral	14th century	5 February 1955	SP3360278975; 52°24′28″N 1°30′27″W	A 14th-century church and later cathedral. Now a ruin, having been destroyed on 14 November 1940 during the Coventry Blitz.	1076651	Ruined cathedral More images
All Saints Church, Allesley	Birmingham Road, Allesley	Church	13th century	5 February 1955	SP3019080655; 52°25′23″N 1°33′27″W	Allesley's village church. Originally built in the years following the Norman conquest, but the current building is 13th-century in origin, though it underwent significant rebuilding in the mid 19th century. The church's wall monuments are of particular interest.	1342900	All Saints Church, Allesley More images
Church of St Bartholomew	Brinklow Road, Binley	Church	1770s	5 February 1955	SP3772978494; 52°24′11″N 1°26′49″W	An 18th-century church, now serving the area of Binley, but originally built to serve Coombe Abbey.	1076629	Church of St Bartholomew More images
Cook Street Gate	Cook Street, City Centre	Town gate	14th century	5 February 1955	SP3353479449; 52°24′43″N 1°30′30″W	One of two remaining gates in the city walls (and the only one still capable of serving as a gate), which were built in the 14th and early 15th centuries despite city walls having little defensive function by then. Cook Street Gate is a crenellated tower above an arch approximately 150 metres (490 ft) from Swanswell Gate (below). (Note: Cook Street Gate, Swanswell Gate, the ruins of St Mary's Priory, and the remains of Caludon Castle are also scheduled monuments and subject to other legislation, which takes precedence over listed building procedures.)	1076640	Cook Street Gate More images
Caludon Castle (remains)	Farren Road, Wyken	Castle	Late 12th century	5 February 1955	SP3737980159; 52°25′05″N 1°27′07″W	All that remains of Caludon Castle is a large grey sandstone wall, but the site was occupied from at least the 11th century until 1815. The site was occupied by several buildings, including a manor, a castle (for which it is named), and a large house, and the surviving wall fragment now sits in an urban park to the east of Coventry city centre.	1076645	Caludon Castle (remains) More images
Church of St John the Baptist	Fleet Street/Corporation Street, City Centre	Church	1343	5 February 1955	SP3305979081; 52°24′31″N 1°30′56″W	A large church at the foot of the historic Spon Street, founded in 1343 and restored in 1608 and 1875–77. Royalist prisoners may have been held here during the English Civil War, which in turn may be the origin of the phrase "sent to Coventry".	1342889	Church of St John the Baptist More images
Ford's Hospital	Greyfriar's Lane, City Centre	Hospital	16th century	5 February 1955	SP3339978822; 52°24′23″N 1°30′38″W	A timber-framed almshouse built around a courtyard, providing housing for six elderly people. Founded in 1509, it was badly damaged during the Coventry Blitz, but restored in the 1950s.	1342891	Ford's Hospital More images
Whitefriars	Gulson Road, City Centre	Friary	Circa 1342	5 February 1955	SP3400378659; 52°24′18″N 1°30′06″W	The remains of a 14th-century Carmelite friary that was abandoned in the Dissolution of the Monasteries. The buildings were used for a variety of purposes from the 16th century onwards and is now used by the nearby Herbert Art Gallery and Museum. All that remains is the cloister wing, located just outside the Coventry ring road, and the gateway from Much Park Street, just inside the ring road.	1076648	Whitefriars More images
The Old Grammar School (St John's Hospital)	Hales Street, City Centre	Grammar School	12th century	5 February 1955	SP3338179297; 52°24′38″N 1°30′38″W	Hospital and chapel dating from the 12th century. Sold and converted to a school in the 16th century, which moved to a larger site in 1885.	1320431	The Old Grammar School (St John's Hospital) More images
Swanswell Gate and city wall to the north	Hales Street	Gate House	Circa 1395	5 February 1955	SP3356279360; 52°24′40″N 1°30′29″W	One of two remaining gates in the city walls, which were built in the 14th and early 15th centuries despite city walls having little defensive function by then. The gatehouse, which is now a private residence, is all that survives. The gatehouse is rectangular, constructed from sandstone, and has a crenelated roof. Contiguous to the gatehouse are Lady Herbert's Garden and the largest remaining fragment of the city walls.	1076649	Swanswell Gate and city wall to the north More images
22 High Street (cellar)	High Street, City Centre	Building	15th century	5 February 1955	SP3348878920; 52°24′26″N 1°30′33″W	Mediaeval sandstone crypt underneath High Street. Only the cellar is listed—the modern building above it is not. The cellar and that of 21 High Street (itself grade II listed) were originally one, but are divided by modern brickwork.	1076612	22 High Street (cellar) More images
Bablake School (former site)	Hill Street, City Centre	School	14th century	5 February 1955	SP3304279119; 52°24′33″N 1°30′56″W	Built in the 14th century as priests' quarters for the nearby St John's church (above). Rebuilt in 1560 as a boys' school. The building has an ashlar wall facing the road on the ground floor and an oversailing timber-framed first floor.	1076616	Bablake School (former site) More images
The Charterhouse	London Road	Timber Framed House	1381	5 February 1955	SP3447678218; 52°24′03″N 1°29′41″W	The original building on the site was the Charterhouse of St Anne, founded in 1381. The current building is the result of many later additions, including timber-framing on the north side. The doors and many of the windows date from the 18th century. Also included in the listing are a collection of 15th- and 16th-century paintings.	1076621	The Charterhouse More images
St. Mary's Priory (ruins)	Priory Row, City Centre	Priory	1043	5 February 1955	SP3349079109; 52°24′32″N 1°30′33″W	11th-century priory built by Lady Godiva and Leofric, Earl of Mercia. The exposed foundations are the only surviving architecture, and a garden has been built around them. The priory was rediscovered in the 19th century when the Blue Coat School was first built. The site has been excavated several times throughout the 20th and 21st century. The school moved in the 1960s and the school building on the priory site is now a grade II* listed building in its own right.	1076588	St. Mary's Priory (ruins) More images
Coventry Cathedral (new building)	Priory Street, City Centre	Cathedral	1951-62	29 March 1988	SP3362779065; 52°24′31″N 1°30′26″W	The 20th-century replacement for the 14th-century cathedral which was destroyed in the Second World War. One of the United Kingdom's most significant architectural commissions in the second half of the 20th century, the cathedral was designed by Sir Basil Spence after a competition. The new cathedral was built between 1951 and 1962 from red sandstone, with concrete and green slate. It is the newest building on this list.	1342941	Coventry Cathedral (new building) More images
Holy Trinity Church	Trinity Lane, City Centre	Church	13th century	5 February 1955	SP3351179052; 52°24′30″N 1°30′32″W	Mediaeval church with later alterations. The spire was rebuilt in the middle of the 17th century and the rest of the church restored in the mid 19th century. Two stained-glass windows were added in the 1950s.	1342893	Holy Trinity Church More images
St Mary Magdalene's Church	Wyken Croft, Wyken	Church	12th century	5 February 1955	SP3666980765; 52°25′25″N 1°27′44″W	Originally built in the 12th century, but with later rebuilding and restoration, only the chancel and the original doorway survive. The tower was added in the 15th century. Much of the rest of the building, including the spire (which was added to the tower) dates to the 19th century. The nave contains a 15th-century wall painting depicting Saint Christopher.	1076583	St Mary Magdalene's Church More images
London Road Cemetery	London Road, Coventry	Cemetery	1847	1 July 1986	SP3418078079; 52°24′00″N 1°29′59″W	An urban cemetery designed in 1845 by Joseph Paxton.	1001205	London Road Cemetery More images

== See also ==
- Grade II* listed buildings in Coventry
- History of Coventry
- Scheduled monuments in Coventry
