= Old Grammar School, Coventry =

Building in Coventry, West Midlands, England

Coordinates: 52.4107°N 1.5108°W

Old Grammar School
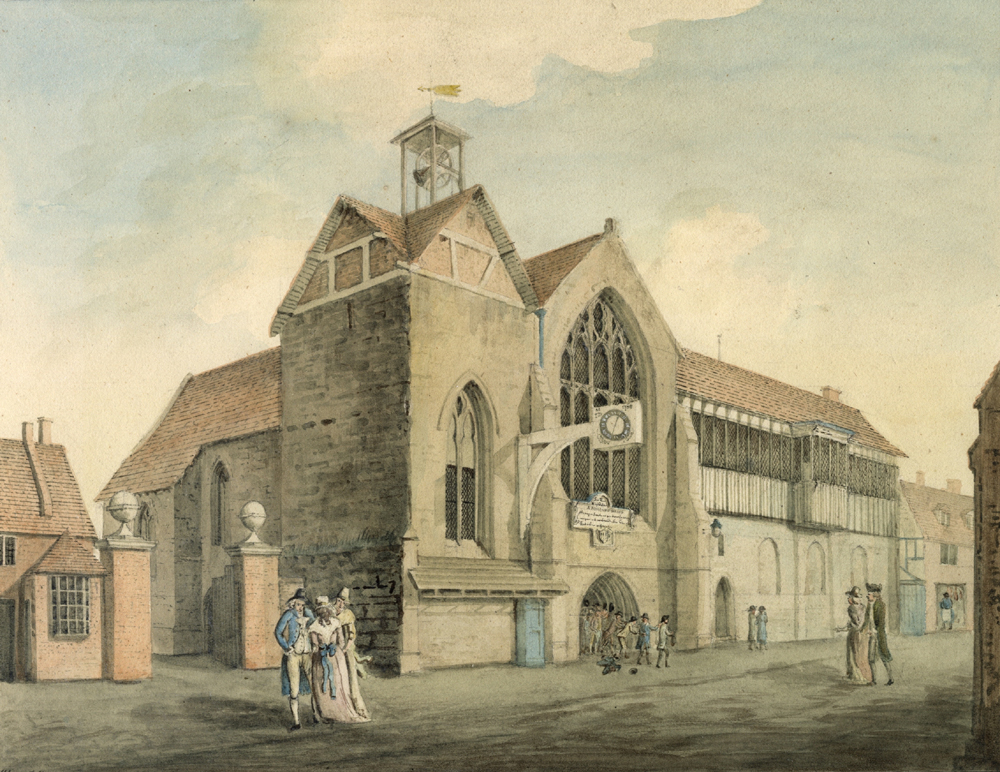
- The Old Grammar School was the site of King Henry VIII School after 1558.
- Interactive map of the Old Grammar School area
- Alternative names: Hospital of St. John the Baptist

General information
- Location: Hales Street, Coventry, United Kingdom
- Current tenants: Coventry Transport Museum

Technical details
- Floor count: 1

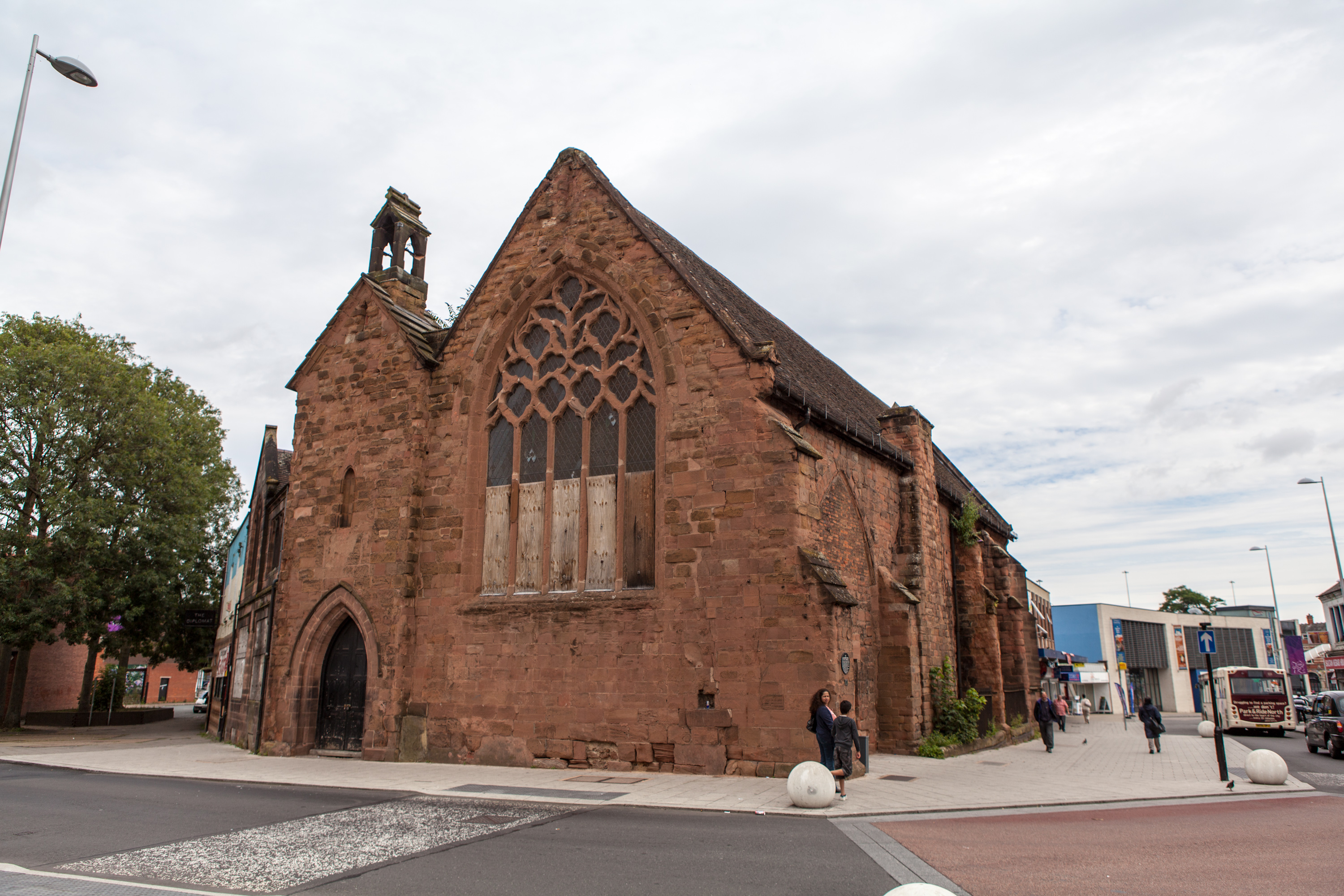
The building as it stands today

The Old Grammar School, Coventry is a Grade I listed building in Coventry, England on the corner of Bishop Street and Hales Street.

== History ==
=== Establishment ===
The Hospital of St John was founded between 1154 and 1179 by Prior Lawrence of the Benedictine Monastery for a warden and a number of secular brothers or sisters. Like many town hospitals in the country dedicated to St. John the Baptist, the objects of the hospital were "to provide a small permanent staff to supervise the house and maintain the chapel services, to afford temporary relief and lodgement for poor wayfarers, and to give more permanent relief to certain of the local poor who were sick or aged".

=== Tudor period ===
Around 1544 the foundation was closed and then sold to John Hales with King Henry VIII setting a condition that Hales started a Free School in Coventry. This he did and a few years later moved the school, named after the king, from the former Carmelite monastery into the hospital.

In 1565, Queen Elizabeth I visited Coventry entering via Bishop Street Gate, and as she passed the school it was mentioned that her father had caused its foundation. She visited and gave a donation for its upkeep.

=== Georgian period ===
When the street outside of the Old Grammar School was widened in 1794, the half-timbered part of the building was demolished and the street was renamed to Hales Street. That same year, the west end of the church and the bell tower were also demolished.

=== Victorian era onwards ===
The King Henry VIII School moved to its present location in Warwick Road in 1885.

After standing empty for over 20 years, it was announced in 2012 that plans were afoot to open the Old Grammar School as an offshoot of the Coventry Transport Museum. In March 2013 planning permission was granted to enable the restoration of the Old Grammar School to be used as an exhibit, education and event space. This included the demolition of an existing adjoining building with the construction of a replacement extension to provide disabled access to the Old Grammar School. The restoration formed part of a £8.5 million redevelopment of the Coventry Transport Museum and began on 31 March 2014 with the Old Grammar School opening to the public on 4 July 2015.

== See also ==
- Grade I listed buildings in Coventry

== Bibliography ==
- McGrory, David (2003). A History of Coventry. Phillimore. ISBN 1-86077-264-1.
- Page, William, ed. (1908). A History of the County of Warwick: Volume 2. Victoria County History.
