= St John the Baptist Church, Coventry =

Church in Coventry, England

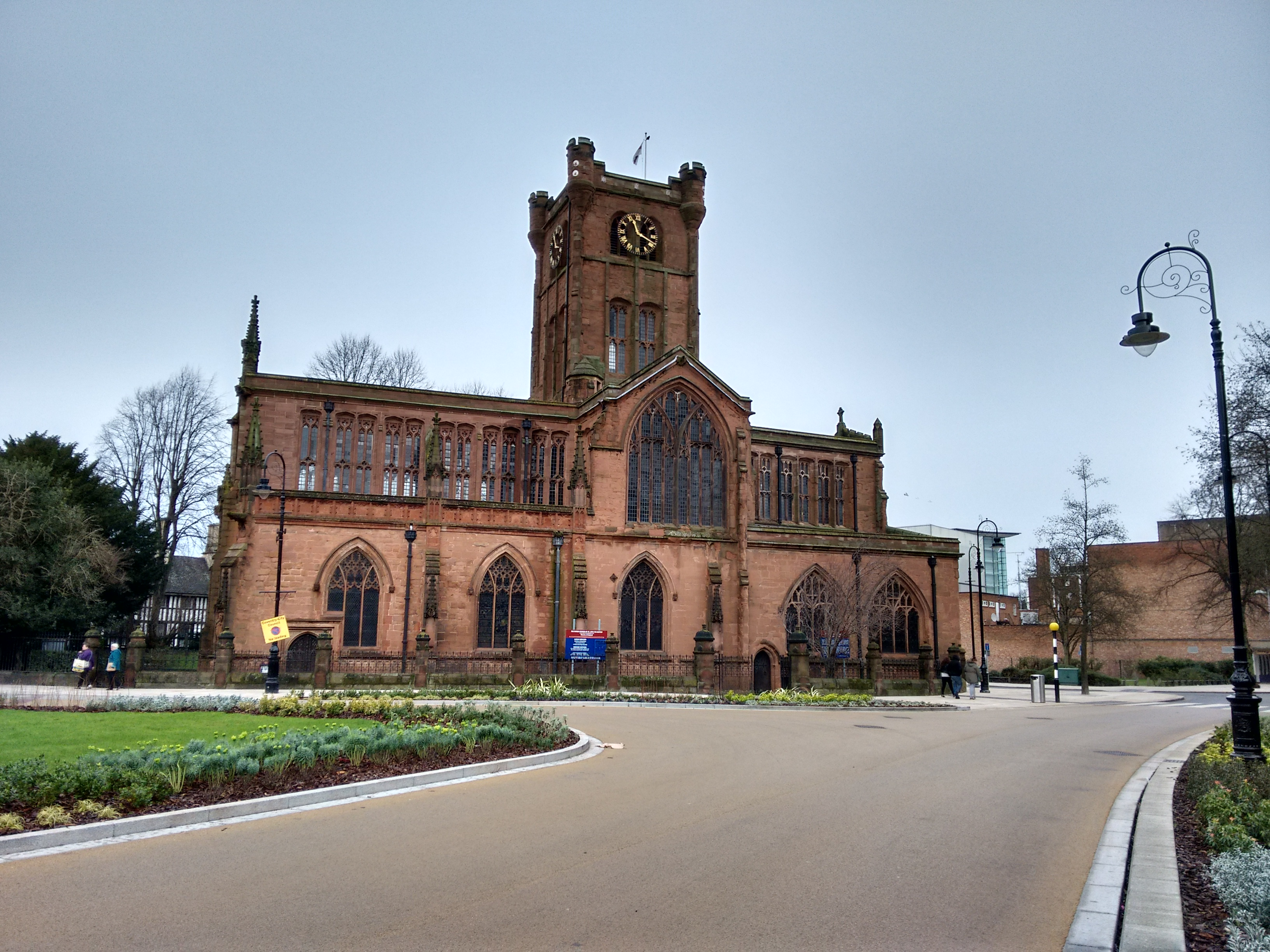
- Front of the church viewed from Corporation Street
- St John the Baptist Church, Coventry
- 52°24′28.86″N 1°30′58.75″W
- OS grid reference: SP 33059 79081
- Location: Coventry
- Country: England
- Denomination: Church of England
- Previous denomination: Roman Catholic
- Churchmanship: Traditional Catholic
- Website: www.stjohnthebaptistcoventry.org.uk

History
- Status: Active
- Founded: 1344
- Founder: Isabella of France
- Consecrated: 2 May 1350

Architecture
- Functional status: Parish church
- Heritage designation: Grade I listed

Administration
- Province: Canterbury
- Diocese: Coventry
- Archdeaconry: Coventry
- Deanery: Coventry North
- Parish: Coventry St John the Baptist

Clergy
- Bishop: Rt Revd Paul Thomas SSC (AEO)
- Rector: Fr Dexter Bracey

The Collegiate and Parish Church of St John the Baptist is an English church located in the Medieval area of Spon Street in the city centre of Coventry, West Midlands. The church is a Grade I listed building.

== College of Bablake ==
The church was founded in 1344 by Isabella of France, who granted the guild of St John a piece of land called "Babbelak" for the construction of a chapel in honour of God and St John the Baptist. This was to be used for their own services, but included a chantry of two priests to sing daily Mass for the royal family. The eastern part was ready for consecration on 2 May 1350.

In 1393 the number of priests was raised to nine. In the early part of the 16th century this was raised to twelve.

The church was built as a guild chapel and through various enlargements and endowments was raised to collegiate status. It remained a guild chapel until all the religious guilds were dissolved in 1548. A wall was discovered in 1875 running north and south through the middle of the chancel, which is thought to have been the east wall of the first guild chapel, while bases of two piers, near the eastern tower were thought by Sir Gilbert Scott to belong to the same early chapel which was dedicated on 6 May 1350. In 1648, the church was desecrated and used as a prison for Scots soldiers taken at the battle of Preston.

The college was dissolved in 1548; the priests were pensioned in sums varying from £5 6s. 8d. to £2 13s. 4d. Five of these pensioners were still living in 1555.

=== Wardens ===
- John Norton c. 1457
- Robert Glasmond c. 1535

== Parish church ==
The church ceased to be used for worship around 1590. During the English Civil War it was a prison for Scottish rebels captured after the Battle of Preston. Later it was used as stables, then a market and a winding and dying house for cloth. In 1734 it was restored as a place of worship. It is now in the Church of England Diocese of Coventry.

St John the Baptist Church possesses a relic of Saint Valentine of Rome, which in 2016 was displayed on the altar in a reliquary during the Mass held on Saint Valentine's Day.

== Furnishings ==
The furnishings are nearly all late 19th or early 20th-century, influenced by the Oxford Movement, with a carved rood screen in late medieval style.

The south chapel has a reredos by Sir Ninian Comper with a central crucifixion group.

== Present day ==
St John's stands in the Traditional Anglo-Catholic tradition of the Church of England. As such, it rejects the ordination of women as priests and bishops. It has passed a resolution under the House of Bishops Declaration on the Ministry of Bishops and Priests, and receives alternative episcopal oversight from the Bishop of Oswestry (currently Paul Thomas). The Church is also associated with The Society.

The Rector of the parish (Fr Dexter Bracey) is also the Bishop's representative of The Society in the Diocese of Coventry.

== See also ==
- Grade I listed buildings in Coventry
