= St Mary Magdalene's Church, Wyken =

Church in Coventry, West Midlands, England

Church of St Mary Magdalene
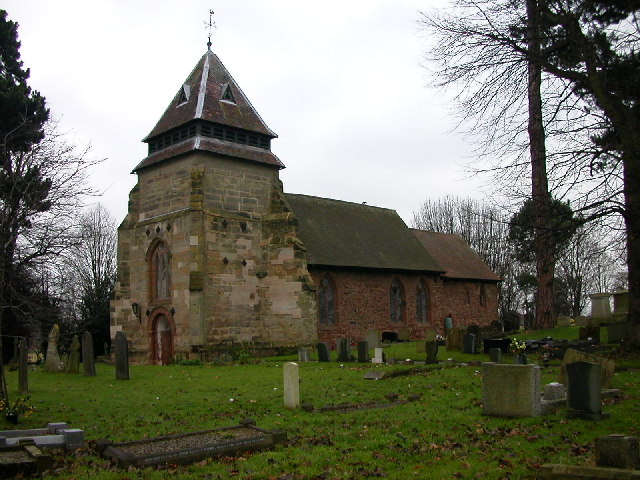

- Location within West Midlands county

General information
- Status: Grade I listed
- Location: Coventry, United Kingdom
- Coordinates: 52.42365°N 1.462195°W
- Completed: 12th century

The Church of St Mary Magdalene is a 12th-century church in the Wyken area of the City of Coventry, in the West Midlands of England. The church is a grade I listed building, though churches in ecclesiastical use are exempt from listed building procedures.

The church was originally built in the 12th century CE, and the original doorway and nave and chancel survive. The nave roof dates to the 15th century, but is covered by 18th century plasterwork on the interior. The building was restored in 1866, and the chancel rebuilt in 1868. The tower was added in the 19th century.
