= Bayley Lane =

Historic street in the centre of Coventry, England

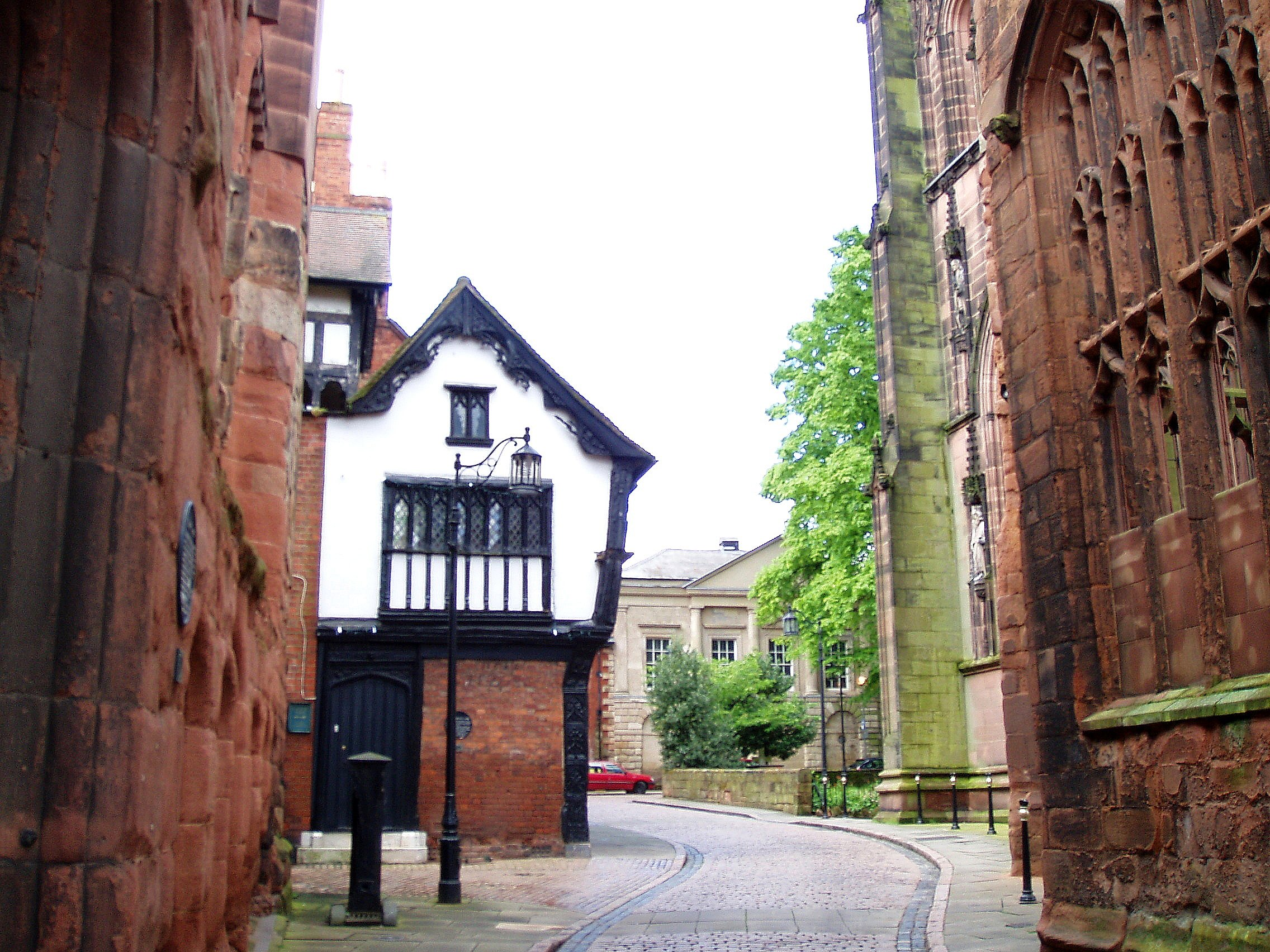
- Location: Cathedral Quarter, Coventry

Bayley Lane is a historic street in the centre of Coventry and is thought to follow the line of the outer ditch or bailey of the former Coventry Castle, founded by the Earls of Chester between 1088 and 1147.

The economic stagnation of the city between the dissolution of the monasteries in 1540s, and the 19th century has enabled several medieval buildings and underground remains to survive.

During extension work on Herbert Art Gallery and Museum (finished in 2008), excavations by Birmingham Archaeology found evidence of occupation in Bayley Lane from as early as the 12th century, and also stone foundations of numerous 14th-century buildings. The excavation also uncovered numerous 19th-century buildings, some of which had been built on the medieval foundations. These included a 14th-century cellar which is now incorporated into the Herbert Art Gallery and Museum. A rare medieval chess piece, thought to be the first of its kind in the region was also unearthed.

== Buildings ==
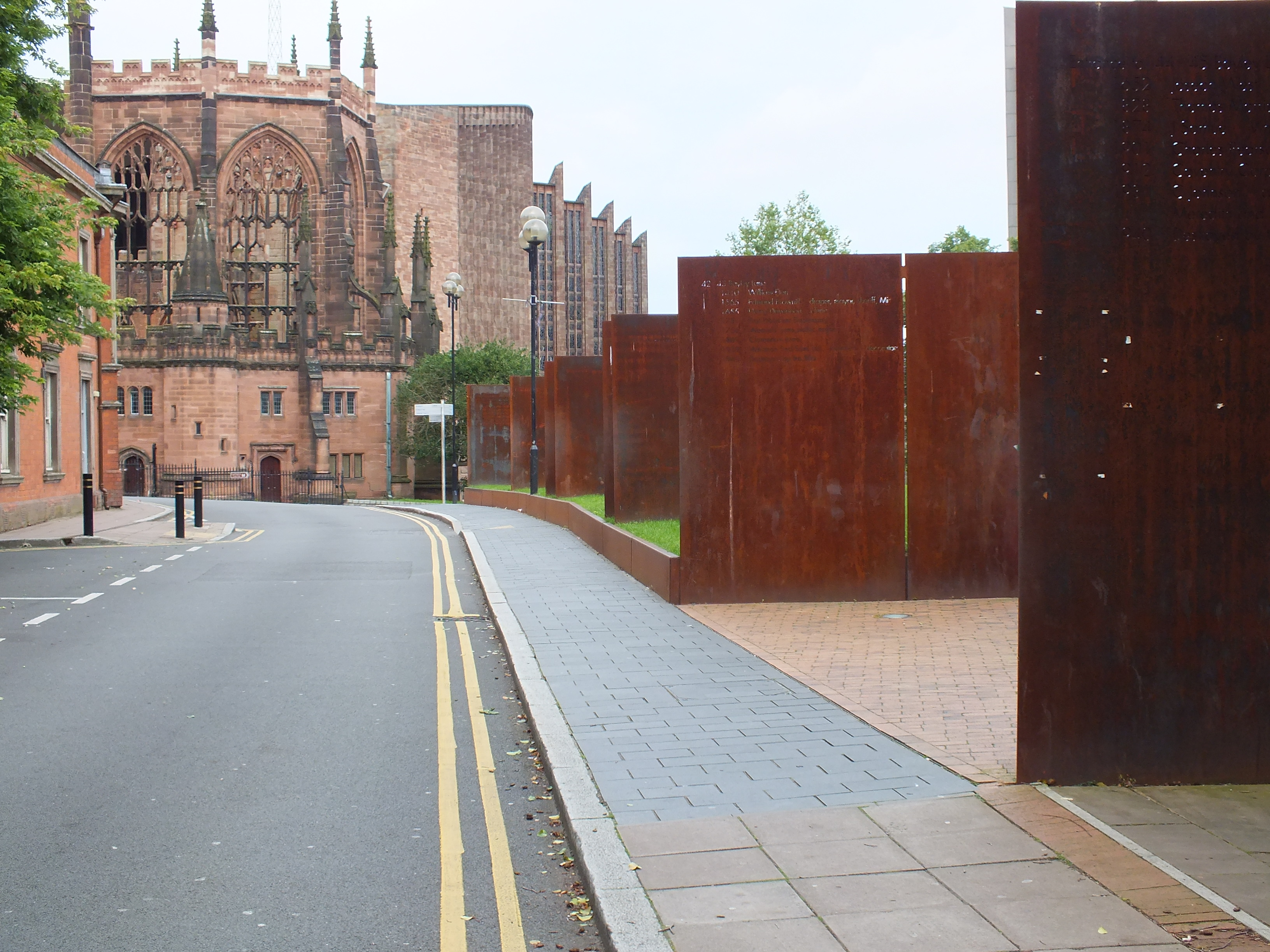
Outside the Herbert Art Gallery and Museum metal signs have been erected commemorating the residents of each Bayley Lane property destroyed during the Blitz.

Many historic properties remain on Bayley Lane.

- 38–39 Bayley Lane: 38–39 is one of a row of buildings on Bayley Lane destroyed during the Coventry Blitz. The cellar is all that remains and is accessible from Herbert Art Gallery and Museum.
- Drapers' Hall: Opened in 1832, the Hall represents at least the third belonging to the Drapers Company on Bayley Lane, the area having been a nucleus of activity for drapers since the late 14th century.
- St Mary's Guildhall: The current St Mary's Guildhall occupies the same site as the first hall constructed for the Guild of St Mary soon after its 1340 foundation. The buildings are mostly 14th–15th century; the hall was most likely rebuilt when the Guild of St Mary was taken over by the Trinity Guild.
- 22 Bayley Lane: The only surviving timber-framed property on Bayley Lane, no. 22 is an early 16th-century house with carved buttresses, carved barge-boards, and traceried panels. Other decorative work of this age and quality is now only to be found at Bond's Hospital and Ford's Hospital.
- Golden Cross Inn: The Golden Cross
- County Hall: Standing on the corner of Bayley Lane and Cuckoo Lane, County Hall housed Coventry's courts when it opened in 1783.

== See also ==
- History of Coventry

== Bibliography ==
- W.B. Stephens, ed. (1969). A History of the County of Warwick: Volume 8: The City of Coventry and Borough of Warwick.
