= The Charterhouse, Coventry =

Grade I listed building in the West Midlands, England

Charterhouse
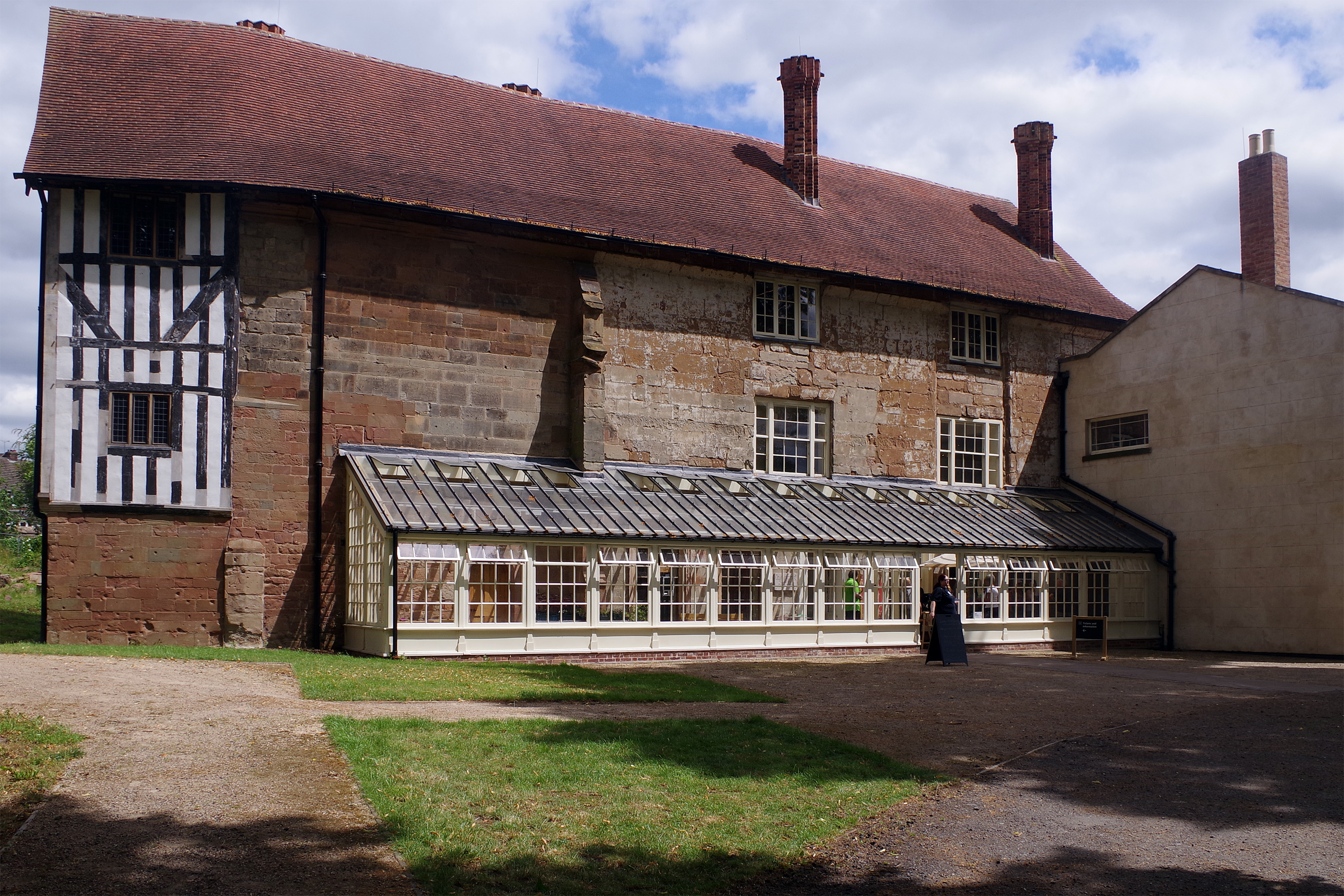

- Location within West Midlands county
- Former names: St. Anne's Priory

General information
- Status: Grade I listed
- Location: London Road, Coventry, England
- Coordinates: 52.4009°N 1.4947°W
- Completed: 1410
- Owner: National Trust

Charterhouse, Coventry (also known as St. Anne's Priory, Coventry) is a grade I listed building on London Road, Coventry, in the West Midlands, England.

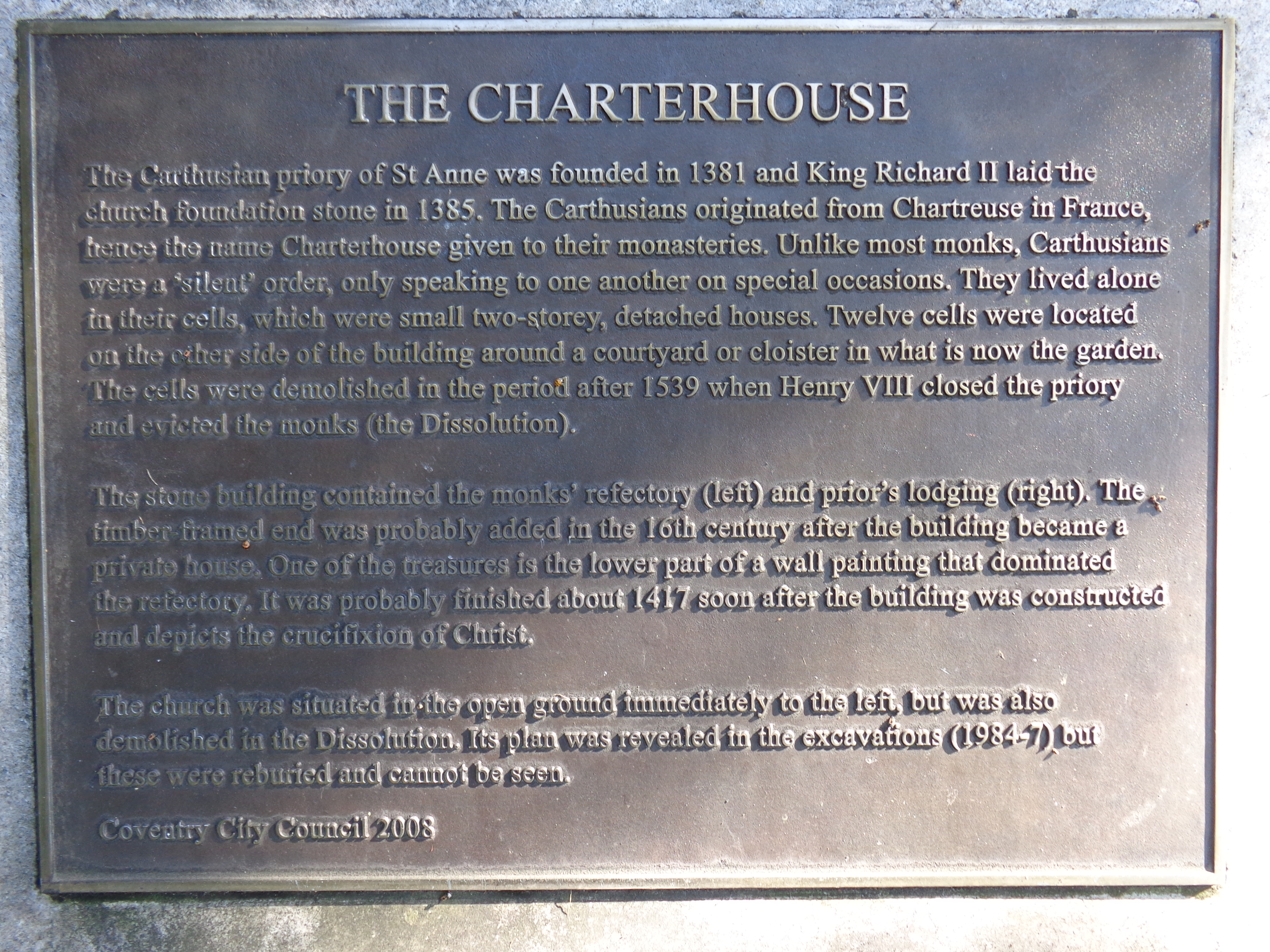
Information plaque, 2008

The current building incorporates remains from the charterhouse of St Anne, a Carthusian foundation for a prior and twelve monks, as well as lay brethren. The charterhouse was initiated in 1381 by William la Zouche, Lord Zouche of Harringworth, Northamptonshire, on 14 acres of land obtained from Sir Baldwin Freville. The foundation stone was laid on 6 September 1385 by King Richard II and Anne of Bohemia, who took over patronage as principalis fundator. Henry VI and Henry VII also became benefactors.

The charterhouse was built from local red sandstone and was completed by 1410. It contains additions from the 15th and 16th centuries, as well as three wall paintings dating to the same era. The earliest painting at the Charterhouse, dated to about 1417, depicts the Crucifixion of Jesus Christ with the Virgin Mary and St Anne on either side and other figures nearby, including the Roman soldier Longinus and an angel collecting Christ's blood. The painting was originally in the monks refectory, with only the bottom half of the work remaining. It is the only surviving medieval wall painting in a Carthusian monastery in England.

The Charterhouse ceased operation as a monastery during the Dissolution of the Monasteries. The last prior was forced to surrender the site to the crown on 16 January 1539 and it was subsequently sold into private hands. The site was owned by Robert Dudley, 1st Earl of Leicester for four years during the reign of Elizabeth I. Some of the original window tracery still survives, but the chapter house, church and wooden monks cells were demolished. A glazed orangery and sash windows were added in the 18th century.

The Charterhouse was used as a private home from 1848 to 1940, when it was bequeathed by the last private owner, Colonel William Fitzherbert Wyley, to the people of Coventry as a centre for arts and culture. Archaeological excavations were conducted by Ian Sodden between 1968 and 1987. The building was then used by Tile Hill College as a training centre for adult education classes until 2009.

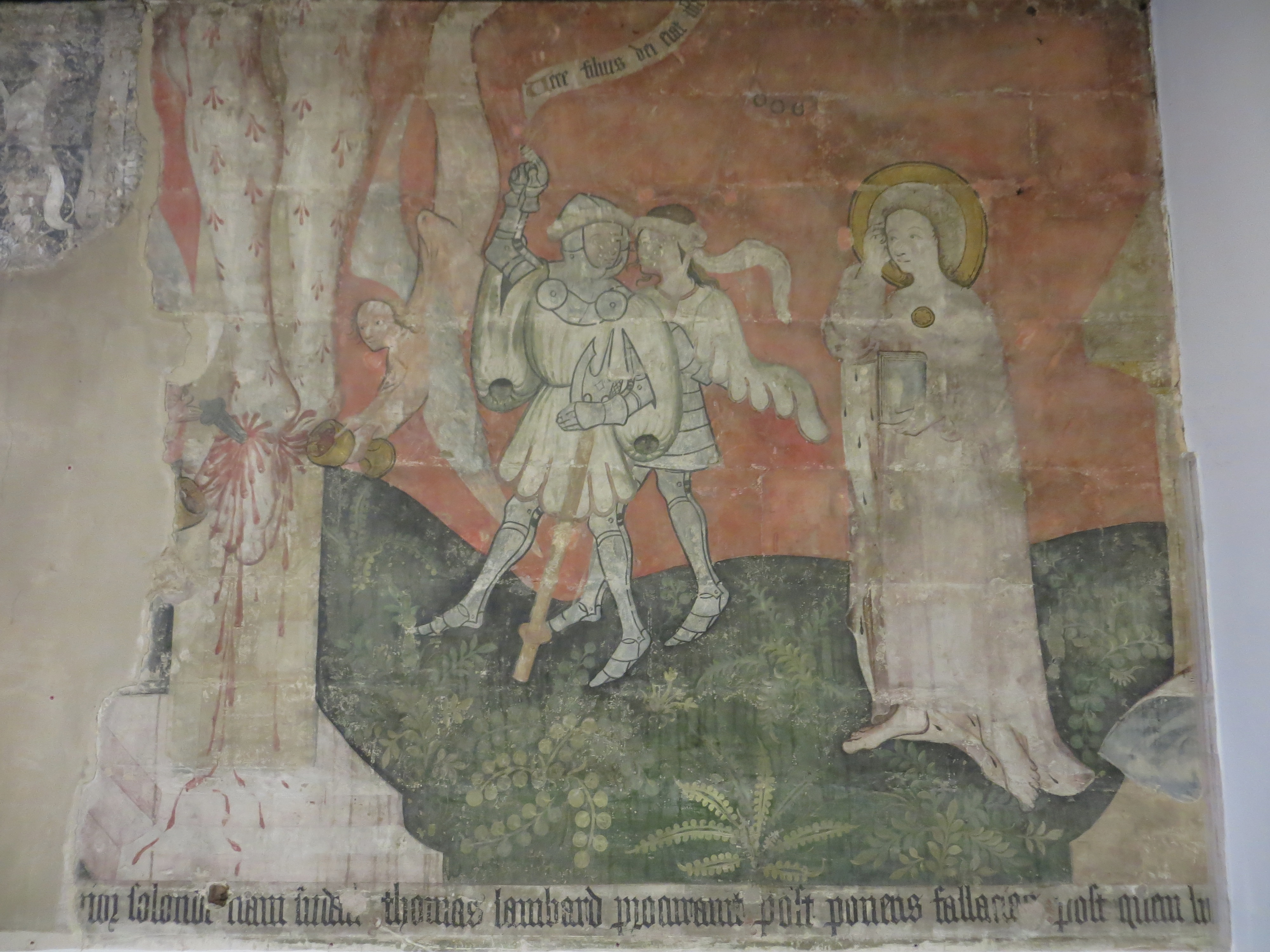
Medieval religious painting of the Crucifixion of Jesus Christ at Coventry Charterhouse

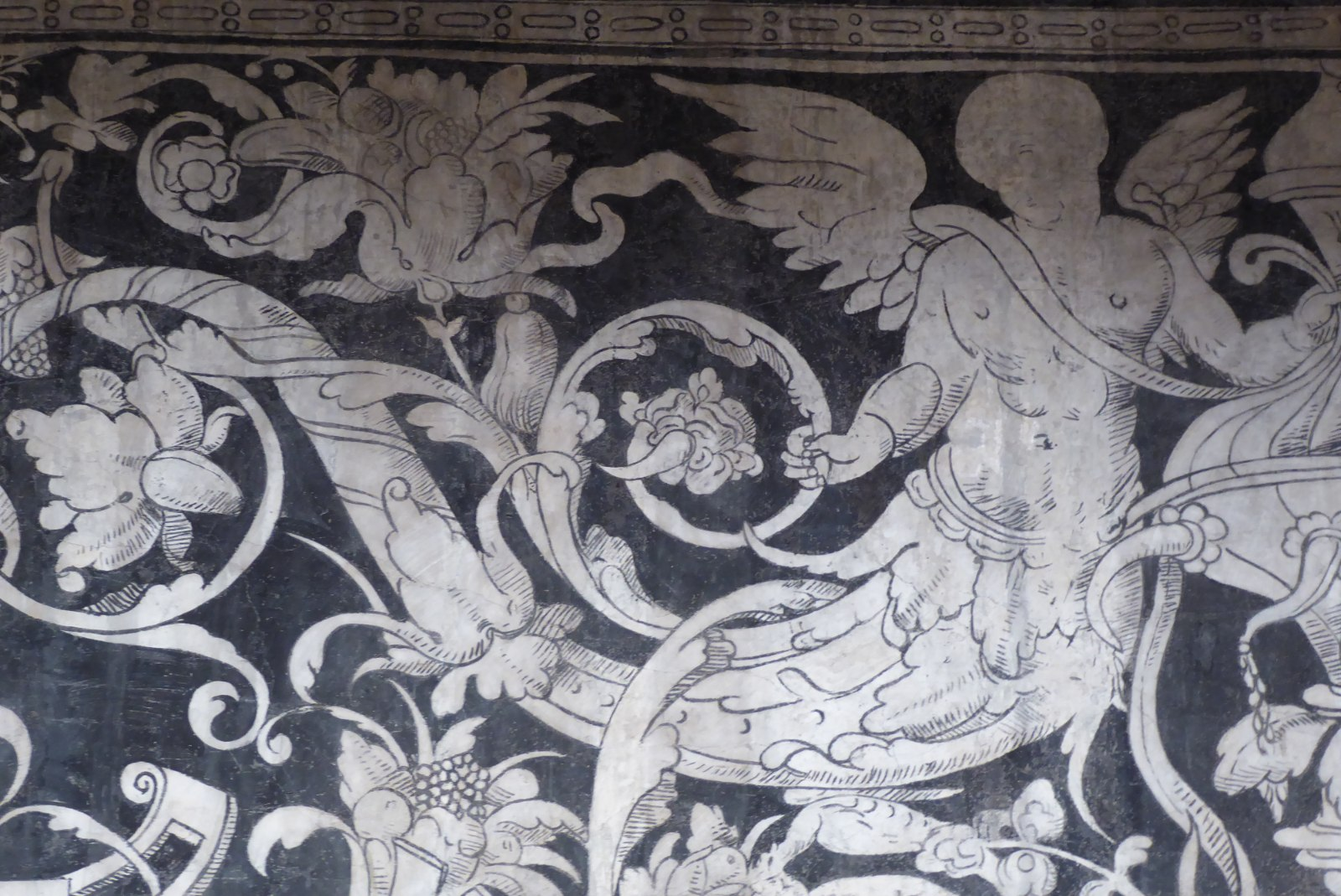
Renaissance black and white wall painting at Coventry Charterhouse

The Coach House and Medieval Precinct Wall to the Charterhouse form a group of listed buildings. The Charterhouse itself is a grade I listed building, the precinct wall is grade II* listed, the coach house is grade II listed, and the whole site is a Scheduled Ancient Monument. The site was placed on the English Heritage at Risk Register due to problems with the roof. After community action to save the Charterhouse, the building is now owned by the charity Historic Coventry Trust which seeks to regenerate the site, supported by grants from the National Lottery Heritage Fund, Historic England and the Historic Houses Foundation.

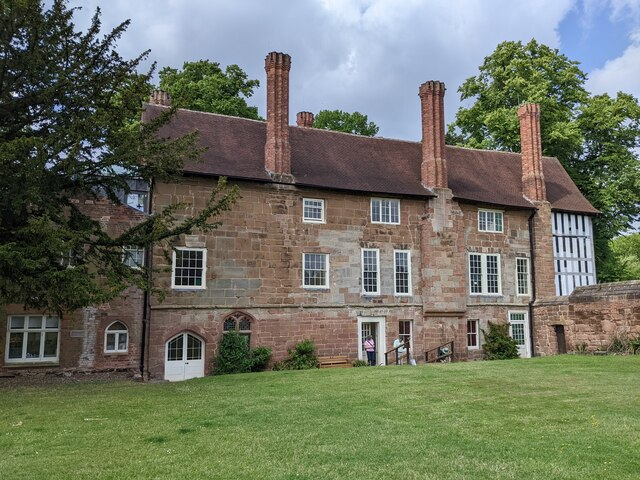
View of Coventry Charterhouse from the garden

The building was removed from the Heritage at Risk Register in 2022, and opened to the public in April 2023. In January 2025, Coventry City Council announced that a partnership with the National Trust had been formed to manage the site. The Charterhouse was reopened as a National Trust property in May 2025.

The Charterhouse is on the banks of the River Sherbourne, Coventry's main river. A short distance away is the Sherbourne Viaduct, a railway bridge carrying the Coventry to Rugby railway line over the river.

== See also ==
- Scheduled Ancient Monuments in Coventry
- Grade I listed buildings in Coventry
- Grade II* listed buildings in Coventry (the Precinct Wall)
