= St Bartholomew's Church, Binley =

Church in Coventry, West Midlands, England

St Bartholomew's Church
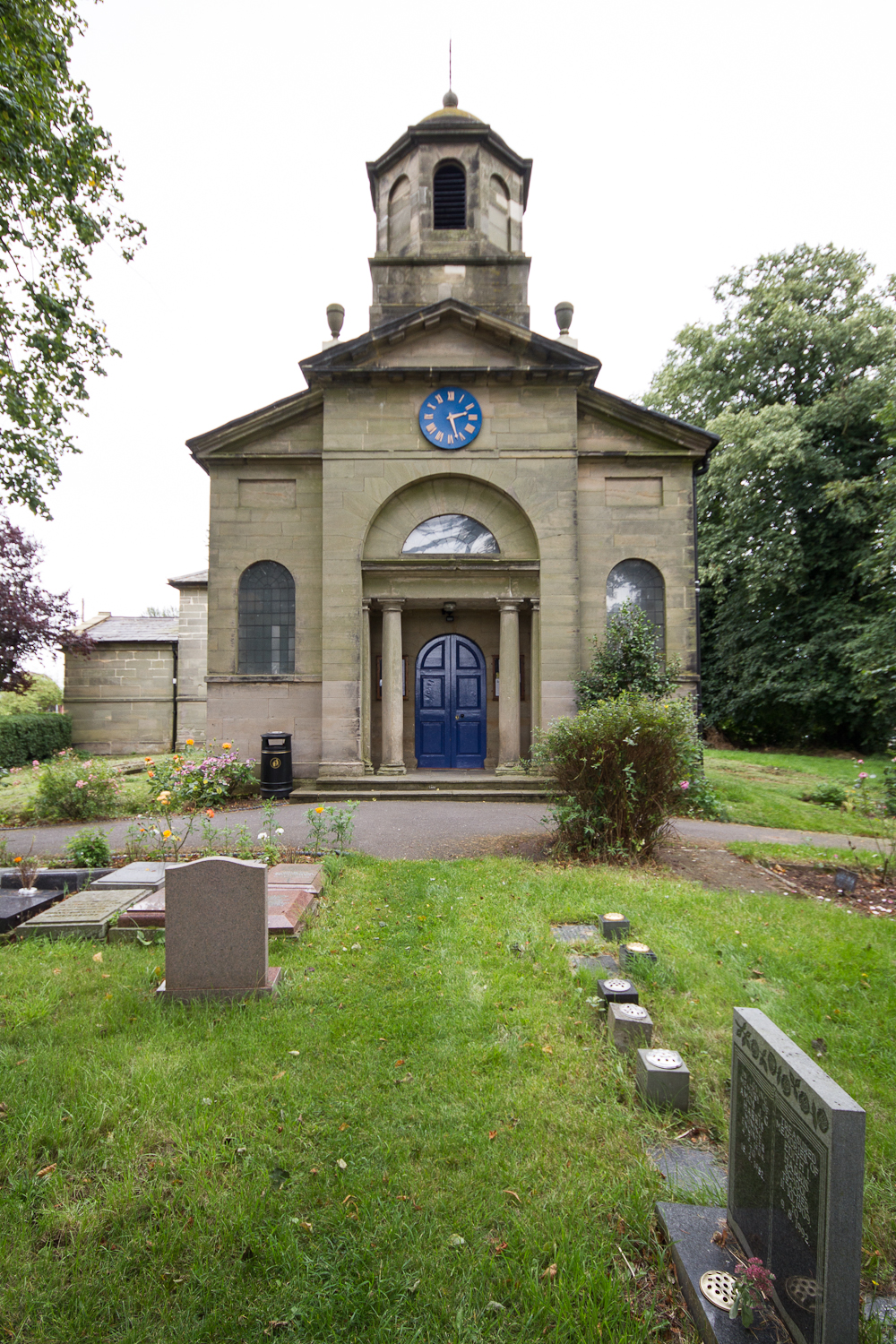

- Location within West Midlands county

General information
- Status: Grade I listed
- Location: Coventry, England
- Coordinates: 52.403162°N 1.446864°W
- Completed: 1771–3

The Church of St Bartholomew is a church on Brinklow Road in Binley, in the City of Coventry in the West Midlands of England. The building is grade I listed, though churches in ecclesiastical use are exempt from listed building procedures. The church was built between 1771 and 1773 for the Earl of Craven of nearby Coombe Abbey.
