= Ford's Hospital =

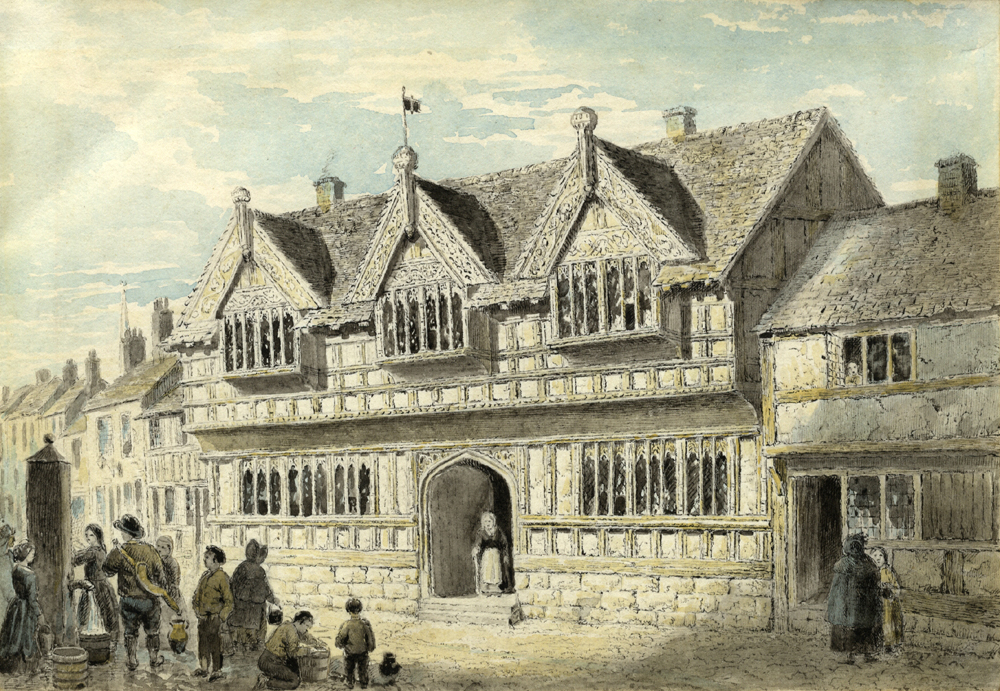
- Watercolour painting of Ford's Hospital by William Hough (1857–1870)

Geography
- Location: Coventry, England, United Kingdom
- Coordinates: 52.4064°N 1.5105°W

History
- Founded: 1509

Links
- Lists: Hospitals in England

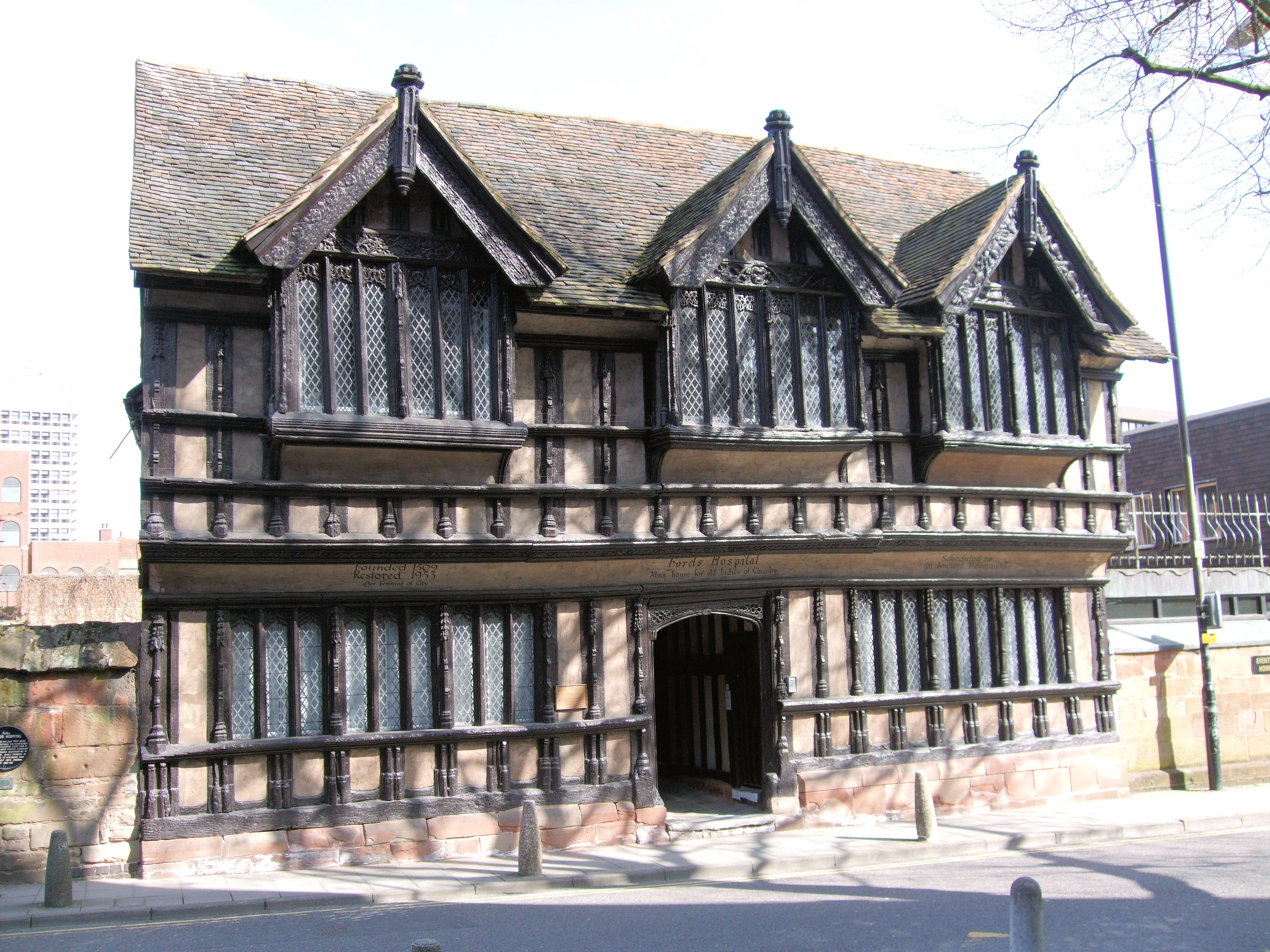
Ford's Hospital (2010)

Ford's Hospital, Coventry, traditionally known as Grey Friars Hospital, is a grade I listed 16th century half-timbered almshouse in Greyfriars Lane, Coventry. It was founded by the merchant William Ford (or perhaps 'Fourd') in 1509 to provide accommodation for six elderly people: five men and one woman. Despite the earlier name of "Grey Friars", it bears no relationship to the Franciscan Order but was so named because of its location on Greyfriars Lane.

The building houses a narrow courtyard measuring 13 yd × 4 yd (11.9 m × 3.7 m) and has been considered by historians and writers to be a particularly fine example of English domestic architecture of the period.

In 1517, following Ford's death, the endowment was extended to allow six places for couples to live together. In 1529, it was extended further to allow five more couples to stay. According to W. Hickling, a Coventry historian writing in 1846, by then it was serving forty women, each of whom received an allowance of three shillings and six pence per week.

During the Coventry Blitz, the building was hit by German bombing, like many other parts of the city. A bomb dropped on 14 October 1940 killed the warden, a nurse and six residents. It was restored with original timbers between 1951 and 1953. The building is located on the site of a chapel within Greyfriars Friary. In 1940, John Bailey Shelton, a Coventry archaeologist discovered encaustic tiles typical of those found in a chapel. The building was built with a considerable amount of teak.

In 2006, the building was used as a location for the episode of Doctor Who called The Shakespeare Code.

In attempting to reconstruct the Globe Theatre, Shakespeare scholars have used Ford's Hospital to understand Elizabethan doorways.

== See also ==
- Grade I listed buildings in Coventry
