= 21–22 High Street, Coventry =

Building in Coventry, West Midlands, England

21–22 High Street
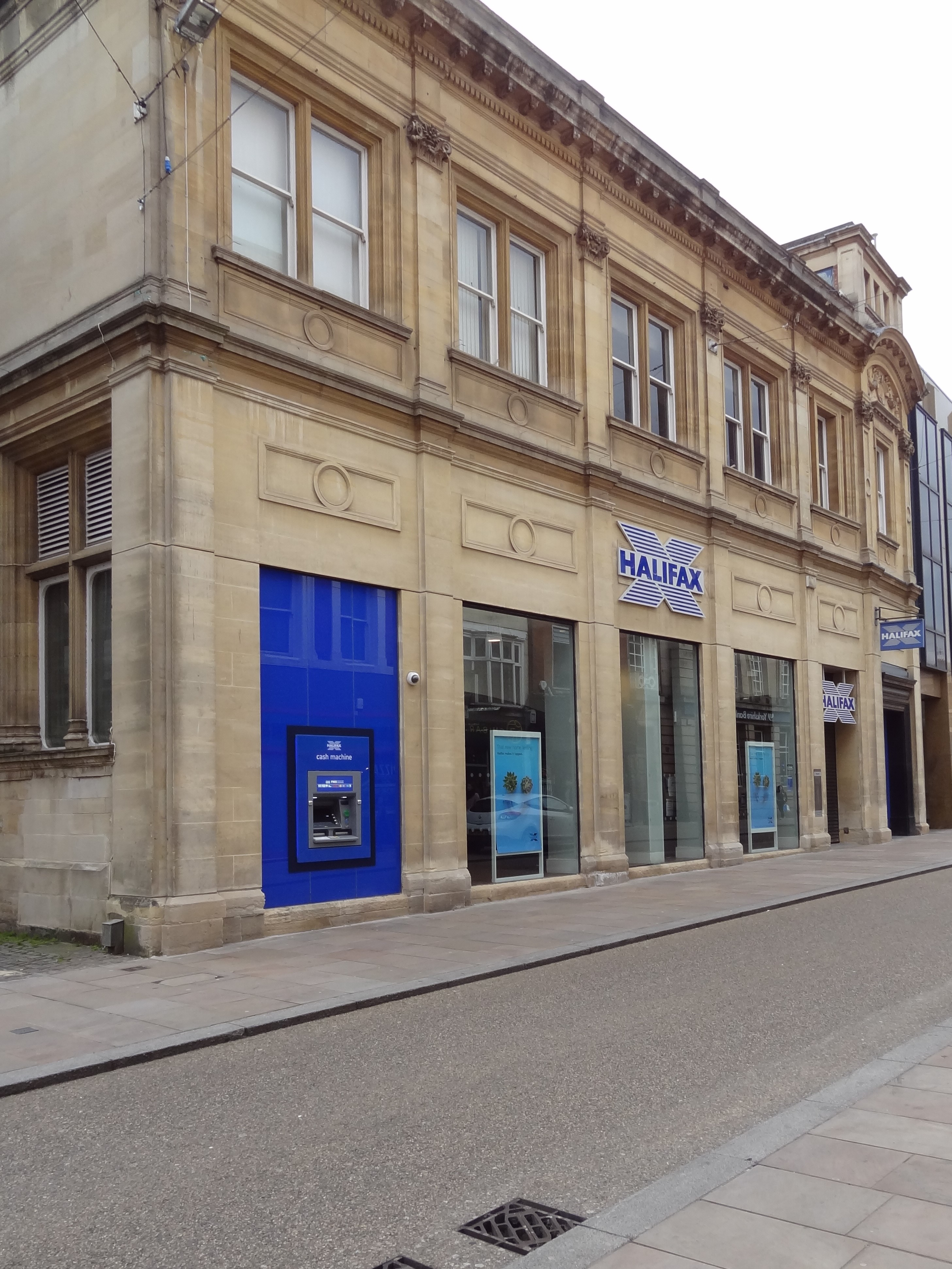

- Location within West Midlands county

General information
- Status: Grade I and Grade II listed
- Location: Coventry, United Kingdom
- Coordinates: 52.407267°N 1.509155°W
- Completed: 15th century
- Owner: Privately owned

The cellars of 21 and 22 High Street are listed buildings in the centre of Coventry, in the West Midlands of England. The cellar of No 21 is a Grade II listed building, while that of No 22 is Grade I listed, meaning that they are sites of "special architectural or historic interest". The cellars were formerly a single crypt, built in the 15th century (CE). They are constructed from sandstone, and measure approximately 17 x 20 feet (No 21) and 56 x 27 feet (No 22). Both are supported by large octagonal columns and ribbed vaulting. They were listed in 1955 (No 22) and 1975 (No 21). The cellars may be some of the oldest remaining traces of domestic building work in Coventry, and several similar cellars exist elsewhere on High Street and other nearby streets, some dating back to the 14th century. The cellars are divided into two aisles, each containing four bays, which are divided by the octagonal columns.

No 22 is one of only 21 Grade I listed buildings in Coventry, while No 21 is one of approximately 350 Grade II listed buildings in the city. The status gives them legal protection against demolition or modifications which would destroy historic features or damage the buildings' character.
