= Caludon Castle =

Grade I listed castle in the United Kingdom

- Coventry, England
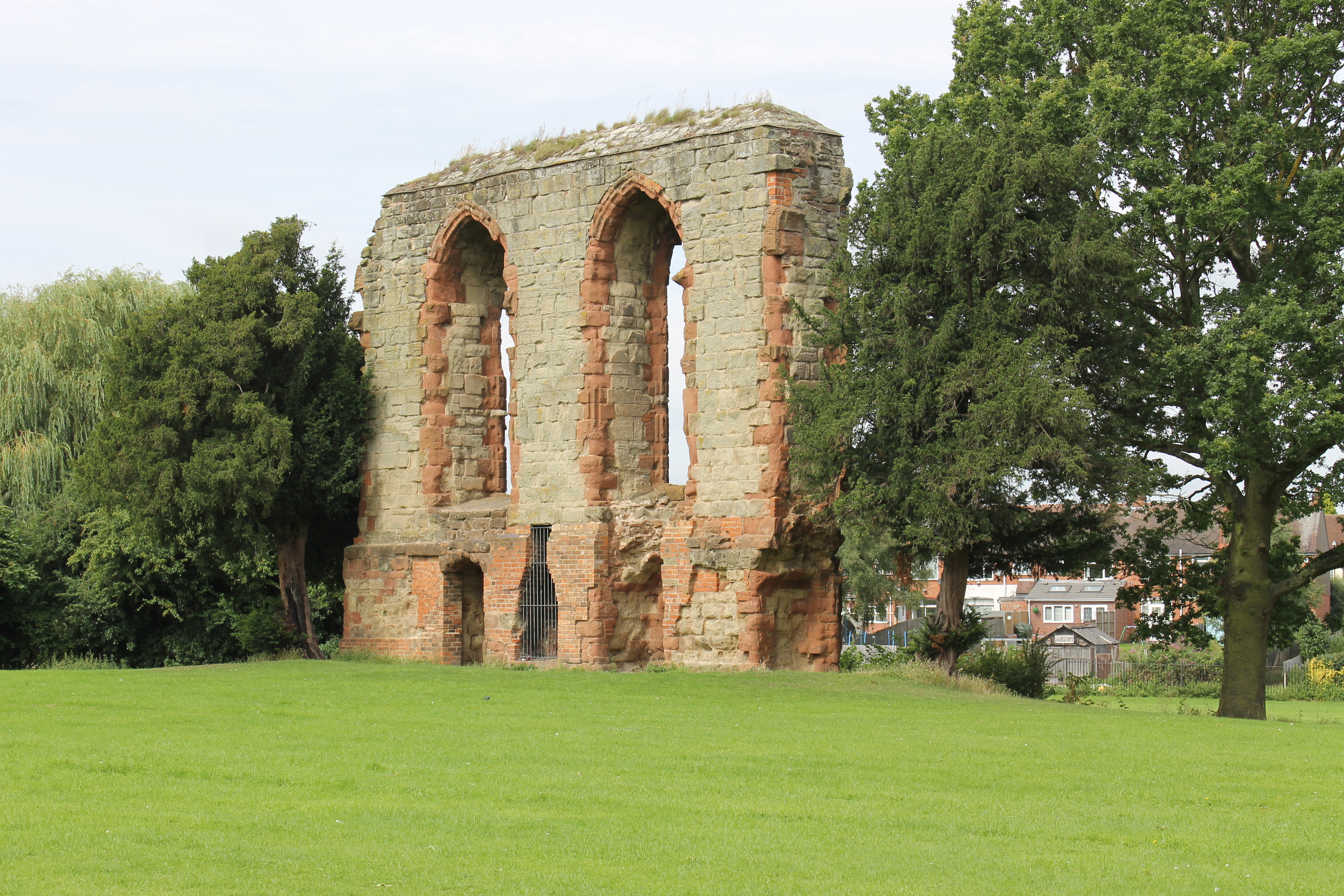
- The lone sandstone wall, all that remains of Caludon Castle. Photographed in 2012.

Site information
- Owner: Coventry City Council
- Controlled by: Coventry City Council
- Open to the public: Yes
- Condition: Ruined

Location
- Shown within the West Midlands
- Location within West Midlands county
- Coordinates: 52.418154°N 1.451822°W
- Grid reference: grid reference SP 37379 80159

Site history
- Materials: Grey sandstone
- Battles/wars: English Civil War

Caludon Castle is a Scheduled Ancient Monument and Grade I listed building in Coventry, in the West Midlands of England. A second moated site 190 metres (620 ft) to the south is a Scheduled Ancient Monument in its own right. The castle is now a ruin, and all that remains is a large fragment of sandstone wall. What remains of the estate is now an urban park, owned and run by Coventry City Council, but much of it was sold and developed into housing estates in the early 20th century.

The site has been occupied since at least the 11th century CE. The original building, pre-dating the Norman Conquest of England, was a large house, which became the property of the Earl of Chester after the conquest. The house was given to the Segrave family in the 13th century, and was first described as a manor in 1239. A licence for crenellation was granted in 1305, at which point the house is thought to have been re-styled as a castle. Another licence was received in 1354, and the property was again rebuilt. In the 14th century, it came into the possession of Thomas de Mowbray, 1st Duke of Norfolk, who was banished in 1398, after which the castle fell into disrepair. Mowbray's son, John, inherited the building, and it remained in the Mowbray family until 1481, when it passed to William de Berkeley, 1st Marquess of Berkeley. It was rebuilt again circa 1580, this time as a mansion, having lain derelict since Mowbray's banishment. The castle was all but destroyed in 1662, and remained in ruins until 1800, when the remains were used in the construction of a farmhouse on the site.

The estate was divided up and much of it sold in 1815, and remained in the hands of multiple private owners until most of the land was purchased by the Coventry Corporation after the First World War and used for housing developments.

== Architecture ==
The remains of the Caludon estate are today located in Wyken, a suburban area to the east of Coventry city centre. However, until portions of it were sold off in the 19th century, the estate was much more expansive. The estate was historically a detached part of St. Michael's parish, but was transferred to Wyken in 1884, which in turn was absorbed into the City of Coventry in 1928. The original boundary of the estate ran from Sowe Bridge (now known as Clifford Bridge, 52.412184°N 1.444941°W) over the River Sowe in the south-east to high ground near Stoke Heath in the north-west.

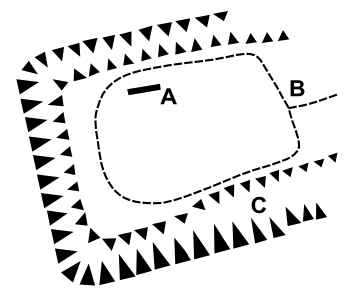
Diagram of remains of the castle from a geophysics survey commissioned in 2008; A – remaining wall; B – remains of pathway around the castle; C – moat

The original castle was in an oval shape, surrounded by a defensive wall, including towers, and a moat. Entrance was via a gatehouse and bridge on the east side. Most living quarters were to the north and west sides of the enclosure, while kitchens and offices were to the south and east. Several farm buildings, associated with the castle, lay just outside the moat, along with a bowling green, gardens, and a three-acre field known as "the pool". When the property was converted to a mansion, circa 1580, many outbuildings were recorded as still standing, including a porter's lodge and brewing house.

A survey conducted in 2008 found the foundations of a rectangular building, oriented north-north-west, thought to be the remains of a large hall, 33 x 13 metres (108 x 43 feet). To the north of the hall the survey found magnetic anomalies representing a complex of living buildings styled as a manor house. The same survey also found large magnetic anomalies in the eastern part of the site, which could be buried rubble from the demolition of a farmhouse, or the remains of in-filled cellars which are believed to have been built on the site. Evidence of a footpath around the interior of the site was also discovered. Given the evidence found, it is likely that the anomalies represent more than one phase of construction, though this could not be conclusively proven with the methods used.

A moat, approximately 190 metres (620 feet) to the south of the castle, was constructed in medieval times, probably around the time of the rebuilding in 1305. A Scheduled Ancient Monument in its own right, the moat encloses approximately an acre of land around the property. The moat may have been an enclosure surrounding farm buildings connected to the castle.

== History ==
The site was originally occupied by a house, which pre-dated the Norman Conquest of England. After the conquest, it came into the possession of the Earls of Chester. In c. 1232, Ranulf de Blondeville, 6th Earl of Chester gave the house to Stephen de Segrave, who served as Chief Justiciar of England. His son, Gilbert de Segrave, inherited the property, and passed it on to his son, Nicholas de Segrave, 1st Baron Segrave, who was created Baron Segrave. The house was first described as a manor in 1239, and, at that time, was the only permanent nobleman's residence in Coventry. The Caludon estate expanded slightly into Wyken, to the north, in 1279 when Nicholas de Segrave purchased a carucate and mill.

The house was likely rebuilt as a castle in 1305, when John de Segrave, 2nd Baron Segrave, Nicholas' son, was granted a licence by King Edward I of England to crenellate the property (decorating a parapet with rectangular gaps in the wall through which archers could fire; largely a status symbol by that time) and to build a moat and wall. The property was also extended with a chapel and several outbuildings at around the same time. Further rebuilding was undertaken in 1354, when another licence to crenellate was received. In the second half of the 14th century, the castle was inherited by Thomas de Mowbray, 1st Duke of Norfolk, who, in 1398, accused Henry of Bolingbroke (later King Henry IV) of treason against King Richard II. The two noblemen were to take part in a duel at Gosford Green, between Caludon Castle and Coventry, but Richard II banished both before the duel could take place. After Henry took the throne, he stripped Mowbray of the dukedom, and Mowbray died in exile shortly afterwards. Mowbray was succeeded by John de Mowbray, 2nd Duke of Norfolk, who was restored to the dukedom.

The property remained in the Mowbray family until the death of Anne de Mowbray, 8th Countess of Norfolk (the child bride of Richard of Shrewsbury, 1st Duke of York) in 1481. Anne's estate was divided between John Howard, 1st Duke of Norfolk and William de Berkeley, 1st Marquess of Berkeley, of whom the latter took possession of Caludon Castle. It lay derelict from shortly after Mowbray's banishment until the late 16th century (circa 1580), when it was rebuilt by Henry Berkeley, 7th Baron Berkeley in the style of a mansion. A large banqueting hall was added later by Elizabeth (née Stanhope), wife of George Berkeley, 8th Baron Berkeley. The latter kept the house until 1632, when he sold it to Thomas Morgan of Weston-sub-Wetherley esq. It passed from Morgan to Sir John Preston through the latter's marriage to Morgan's daughter and co-heir, Jane. The house was badly damaged in 1662 when King Charles II took revenge on Coventry for its heavily parliamentarian sympathies in the English Civil War. Their son, Sir Thomas Preston, inherited the estate, and upon his death in 1709 it passed to his daughter, Anne and her husband, Hugh Clifford, 2nd Baron Clifford of Chudleigh. The Cliffords retained the property, using the ruins of the castle to build a large farmhouse in 1800, until 1815, when the estate was divided up and much of it sold. The estate was then held by various private owners until after the First World War, when the Coventry Corporation purchased much of it and developed the area into suburban housing estates.

== Modern day ==
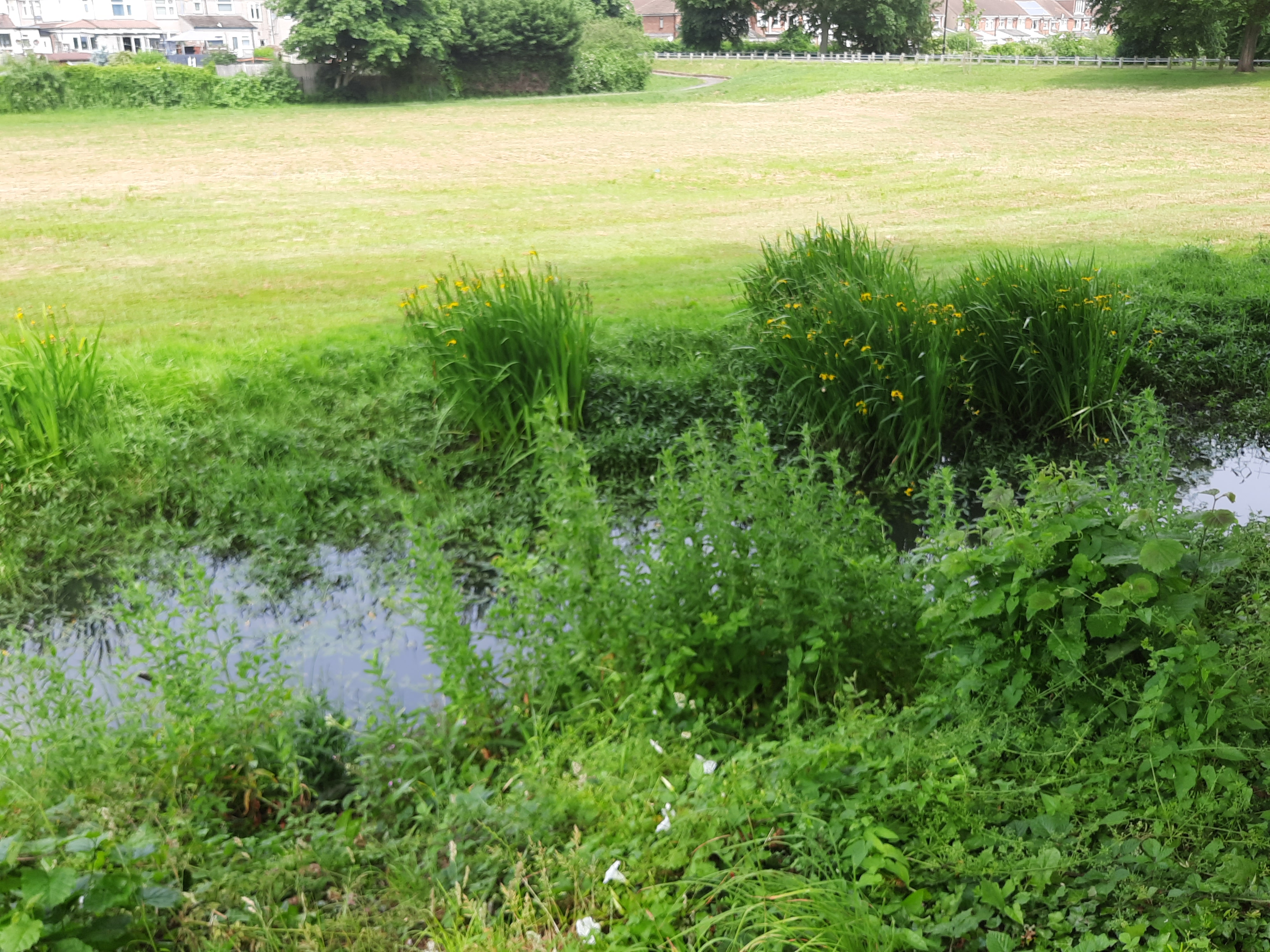
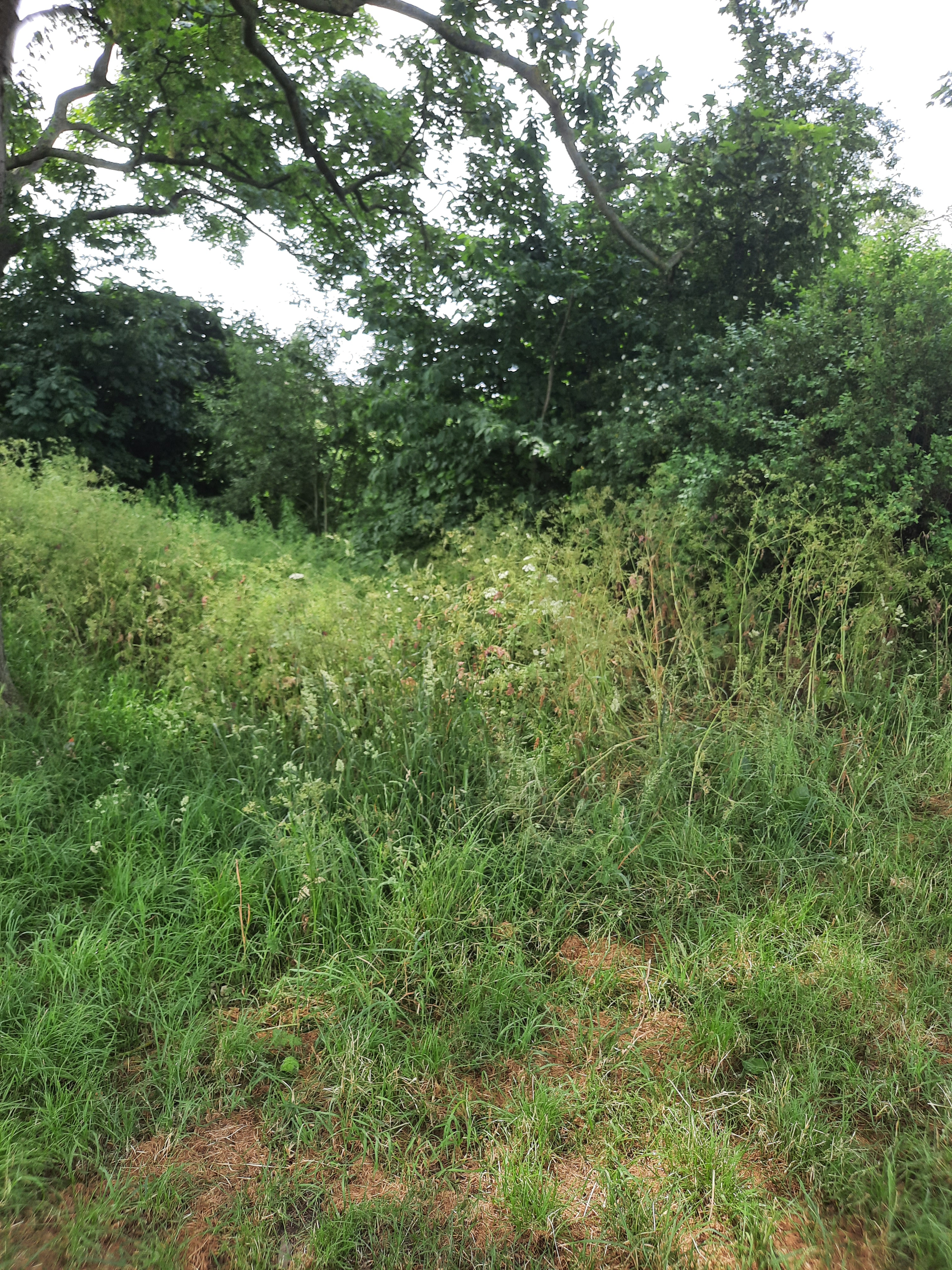
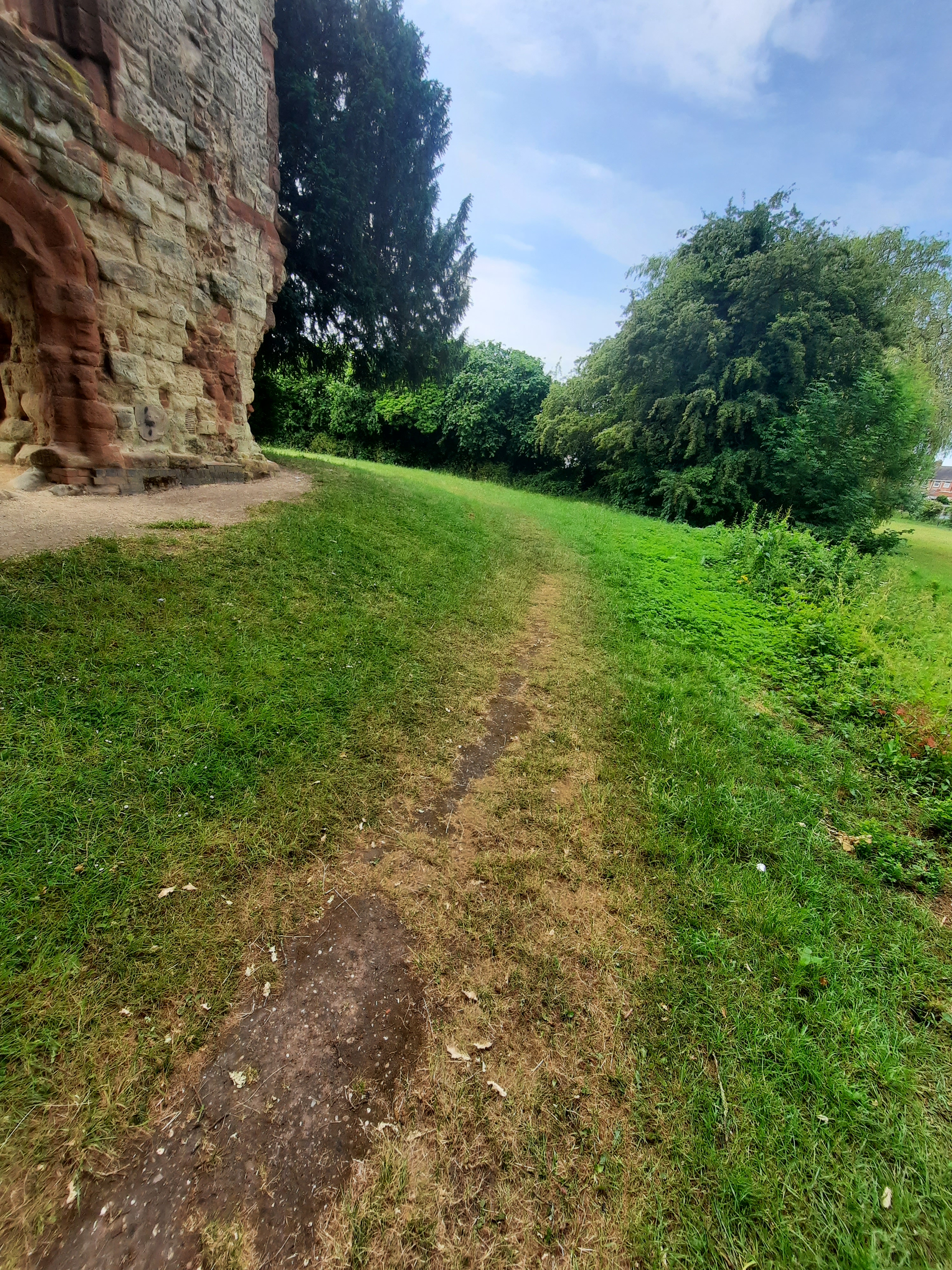
14th century moat from the north (left) and south (middle), and part of the earthworks (right); all photographed in 2023

The castle is now a ruin, and all that remains above ground is a large grey sandstone wall, which has been the only remnant of any building on the site since at least the early 18th century. It includes two large tracery windows, decorated by red sandstone, which stand out against the grey. Red sandstone also appears at both ends of the walls, suggesting at least two more windows, and meaning that the wall would have been at least twice the length of the surviving fragment when built. Beneath the large windows are two smaller ones, suggestive of an undercroft, and a flue runs between the sets of windows. The wall fragment is thought to be 14th century, likely dating from the reconstruction in 1354.

The castle is now situated in a small urban park called Caludon Castle Park, owned and managed by Coventry City Council. The moat is now dry, and at least part of it is filled in, but parts are still visible, along with other earthworks. The remaining wall is a Scheduled Ancient Monument, as is the moated site to the south. Since 1955, the wall has also had Grade I listed building status.

== See also ==
- Castles in Great Britain and Ireland
- Scheduled Ancient Monuments in Coventry
- Grade I listed buildings in Coventry
- List of castles in England
