= Grade II* listed buildings in Coventry =

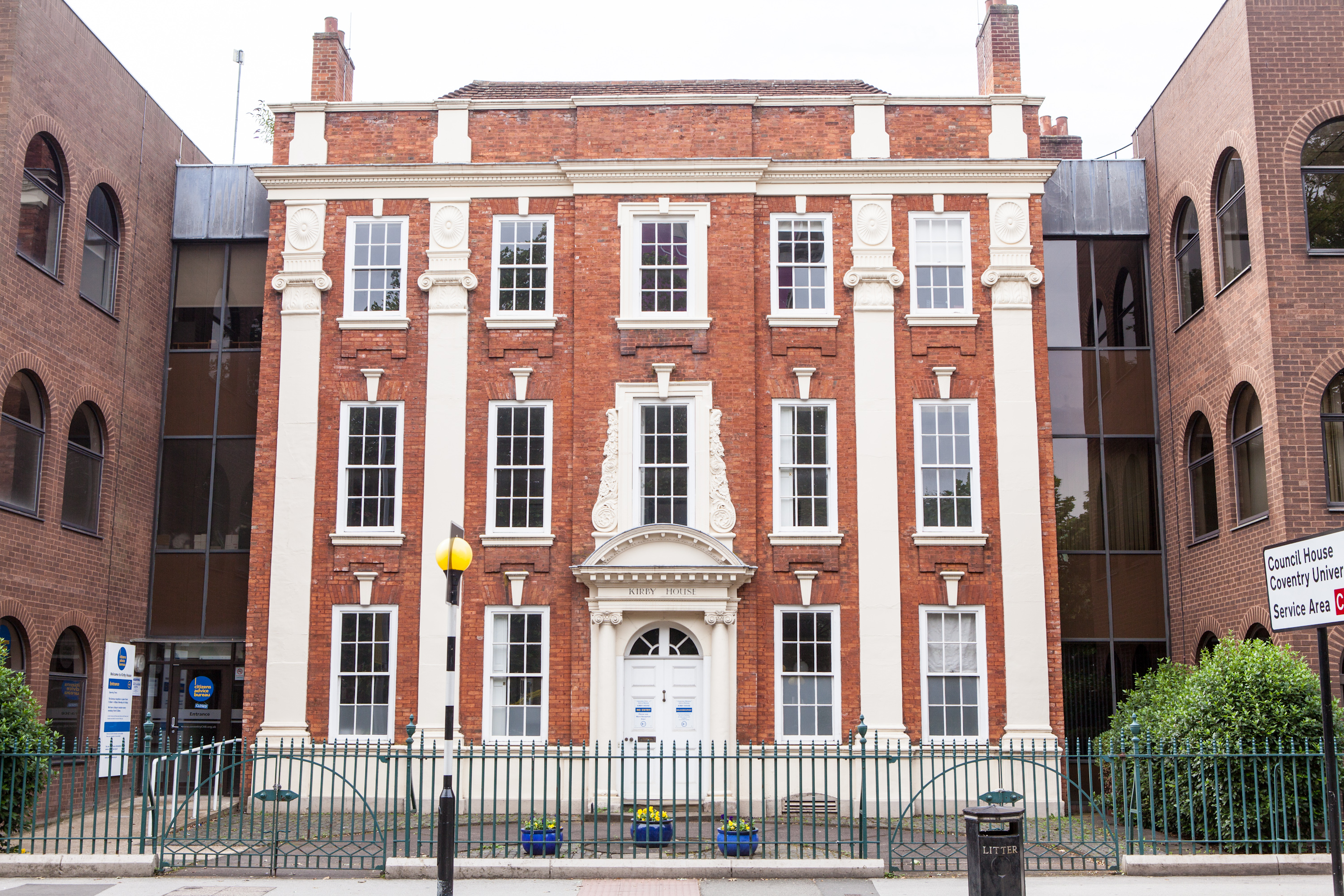
Kirby House is an 18th-century building which is now Grade II* listed.

There are 24 Grade II* listed buildings in the City of Coventry. In the United Kingdom, a listed building is a building or structure of special historical or architectural importance. These buildings are legally protected from demolition, as well as from any extensions or alterations that would adversely affect the building's character or destroy historic features. Listed buildings are divided into three categories—Grade I buildings are buildings of "exceptional" interest, Grade II buildings are buildings of special interest, and Grade II* buildings are Grade II buildings that are of particular interest. Coventry is an ancient city and a metropolitan borough in the West Midlands of England. The city's history dates back to at least the 11th century (CE), and it was a thriving centre of commerce in mediaeval times.

The oldest building on this list is St Lawrence's Church—originally built in the 14th century—and the newest are the Houses for Visiting Mathematicians at the University of Warwick, completed in 1969. Sir William Reid Dick's sculpture of ancient Coventry noblewoman Lady Godiva is the city's only other Grade II* listed building from the 20th century. There are no Grade II* listed buildings in Coventry from the 13th, 17th, or 21st centuries, but there is at least one from every other century between 1100 and 2000. Of those, more buildings (six) date to the 14th century than any other, though five were built in the 16th century. The construction date of two buildings—the Mediaeval Stone Building on Much Park Street and the basement of the former Old Starr Inn—are not known, though both date from the Middle Ages.

Many of the buildings have changed use over their lifetime. Five are or were churches or chapels, of which four remain places of worship. The fifth, Christchurch Steeple, was originally part of a 13th-century friary and served as a church until it was mostly destroyed in World War II bombing, which left only the steeple. The building is now a popular bar. Four other Grade II* listed buildings in the city are pubs or bars, or were at some point in their history.

== Grade II* listed buildings ==
Name	Location	Type	Completed (Note: The date given is the date used by Historic England as significant for the initial building or that of an important part in the structure's description.)	Date designated	Grid ref. (Note: The grid reference is based on the British national grid reference system, sometimes known as OSGB36, used by the Ordnance Survey.) Geo-coordinates	Notes	Entry number (Note: The "List Entry Number" is a unique number assigned to each listed building and scheduled monument by Historic England.)	Image
Draper's Hall	Bayley Lane, City Centre	Livery Hall	1832	10 May 1957	SP3363178951; 52°24′27″N 1°30′25″W	Neoclassical 19th-century hall designed by H W Hutchinson and T Rickman. Built mainly with ashlar, the hall was built in 1832 with addition in 1964. The building is a single storey with a fluted cornice and elaborate exterior decoration. Drapers' Hall is described as "the most interesting building of its period in the City."	1076660	Draper's Hall More images
Number 22 (the Cottage)	Bayley Lane	Timber Framed House	Circa 1500	5 February 1955	SP3356378975; 52°24′28″N 1°30′29″W	The Cottage is a timber-frame building with plaster infilling and brickwork on the ground floor. The first floor oversails the ground floor. The ground floor was converted to a shop in the 19th century and the shop window survives. Part of a group with St Mary's Guildhall (Grade I) and Number 21 (Grade II).	1342896	Number 22 (the Cottage) More images
Number 65 (Stone House)	Birmingham Road, Allesley	House	Circa 1557	5 February 1955	SP3011880596; 52°25′21″N 1°33′31″W	Number 65 is a large sandstone house, built in the 16th century for John Milward. The central porch contains several features of particular interest, including pilasters and a flattened ogee arch.	1076663	Number 65 (Stone House) More images
Self Sacrifice (Lady Godiva statue)	Broadgate, City Centre	Statue	1949	15 April 1998	SP3340379003; 52°24′29″N 1°30′37″W	Bronze statue on stone base sculpted by Sir William Reid Dick. Commissioned by William Bassett-Green and donated to the city in 1949 to boost morale in post-war Coventry. The statue was rotated 90° in 1990.	1031589	Self Sacrifice (Lady Godiva statue) More images
County Hall	Cuckoo Lane, City Centre	County Court	18th century	24 June 1974	SP3352278997; 52°24′29″N 1°30′31″W	Originally the county court, County Hall is an 18th-century red-brick building with stone dressings on the front. Quoins are built into the sides and corners of the building. The second story has pilasters to the sides and cornice at the top of the second storey. The building is now used as a bar.	1076642	County Hall More images
Medieval Basement on Site of Old Star Inn	Earl Street, City Centre	Basement	Late mediaeval	5 February 1955	SP3365378869; 52°24′24″N 1°30′24″W	Late mediaeval ashlar basement. The site was formerly occupied by the Old Star Inn, but is currently used by Coventry City Council. The basement consists of four ribbed vaults, whose ribs rest on corbels.	1115642	Upload Photo
Bird Grove House	George Elliot Road, Foleshill	House	19th century	24 June 1974	SP3374680340; 52°25′12″N 1°30′19″W	A two-storey stucco house with slate roof. From 1841 to 1849, the building was the residence of novelist George Eliot.	1076646	Bird Grove House More images
Houses for Visiting Mathematicians	Gibbet Hill Road (University of Warwick)	Apartment	1970	7 June 2007	SP3071675385; 52°22′32″N 1°33′01″W	A set of five houses arranged around the points of a compass. They were built between 1968 and 1969 for academics attending mathematics conferences at the University of Warwick. The houses are brick, with timber window surrounds and flat felt roofs. The set won the Royal Institute of British Architects Award in 1970.	1392017	Houses for Visiting Mathematicians More images
Golden Cross Inn	Hay Lane, City Centre	Jettied House	Circa 1583	5 February 1955	SP3353678972; 52°24′28″N 1°30′30″W	The Golden Cross is a 16th-century pub that was reputedly built around 1583 but has since undergone significant restoration. The building is three storeys tall and timber-framed with plaster infilling, while the roof is tile with brick chimney stacks. The oversailing of the upper floors is of particular interest.	1116277	Golden Cross Inn More images
Bond's Hospital	Hill Street, City Centre	Hospital	Early 16th century	24 June 1974	SP3302379131; 52°24′33″N 1°30′57″W	Almshouse founded by the will of Thomas Bond, who died in 1506. Bond's Hospital was originally built in the 16th century, but underwent significant restoration work in the 19th century. The building is mainly timber frame but contains more modern brickwork and ashlar. Of particular interest are the large oriel windows on the first floor.	1076615	Bond's Hospital More images
Number 7	Little Park Street, City Centre	House	18th century	5 February 1955	SP3352078853; 52°24′24″N 1°30′31″W	One of two Georgian townhouses on Little Park Street (the other being Kirby House, also Grade II* listed). The building is three storeys and stands on a large plinth. The exterior is decorated with six fluted Corinthian pilasters, over which an entablature projects forward on the second storey. The pilasters continue on the third storey, but are plain. The central door is flanked by two further pilasters. The building is now a bar.	1145820	Number 7 More images
Number 16 (Kirby House)	Little Park Street, City Centre	House	Circa 1700	5 February 1955	SP3351178795; 52°24′22″N 1°30′32″W	One of two Georgian townhouses on Little Park Street (the other being Number 7, also Grade II* listed). The house is red brick, with stucco at the bottom of the ground floor, a cornice, and a tiled roof behind a parapet. The large doorway contains a fanlight and is flanked by two columns. The exterior is decorated with four pilasters. The listing includes the railings to the forecourt, which were added in the 19th century.	1342916	Number 16 (Kirby House) More images
Precinct wall at the Charterhouse	London Road	Precinct Wall	14th century	24 June 1974	SP3452878293; 52°24′06″N 1°29′38″W	Mediaeval red sandstone wall with ashlar face. Part of a group with the Charterhouse (Grade I) and the Coach House at the Charterhouse (Grade II).	1342917	Precinct wall at the Charterhouse More images
Non-conformist Chapel	London Road Cemetery	Nonconformist Chapel	1847	24 June 1974	SP3419378021; 52°23′57″N 1°29′56″W	An ashlar classical temple with two storeys and a basement, supported by piers on the corners. The chapel has two large fluted columns at the front with a large portico between them. The building was abandoned after it was damaged during the Second World War. It has not been used since, nor has any restoration been undertaken, and the state of the building is described by English Heritage as "dilapidated".	1076624	Non-conformist Chapel More images
Cheylesmore Manor	Manor House Drive, City Centre	Manor House	16th century	5 February 1955	SP3335878645; 52°24′17″N 1°30′40″W	The building serve as the gatehouse for the much older manor and is now all that remains of it. It is timber-framed with plaster infilling and stonework on the ground floor. The interior has been significantly rebuilt. The central carriageway contains four arched doorways (now blocked). The building is now used as the city's register office.	1299033	Cheylesmore Manor More images
Numbers 36 & 37 (Whitefriars Gate)	Much Park Street, City Centre	House	14th century	5 February 1955	SP3376878664; 52°24′18″N 1°30′18″W	Timber frame and sandstone house, originally a gatehouse to a Carmelite priory. The archway leads to Whitefriars Lane and from there to the surviving fragments of the priory. Later repairs were made with red brick.	1087114	Numbers 36 & 37 (Whitefriars Gate) More images
Christchurch Steeple (Greyfriars)	New Union Street, City Centre	Church	14th century	5 February 1955	SP3332878751; 52°24′21″N 1°30′41″W	The steeple was originally part of a 13th-century Franciscan friary. The church was rebuilt in the 19th century, but the main church building was destroyed in an air raid in the Second World War, leaving just the steeple, which is now a bar.	1076628	Christchurch Steeple (Greyfriars) More images
Old Blue Coat School	Priory Row, City Centre	School	19th century	5 February 1955	SP3349779129; 52°24′33″N 1°30′32″W	19th-century stone building in the style of a French château. The building consists of two wings, of which the left is two storeys and the right three storeys, each with a tower. The towers are supported by octagonal buttresses and are the only above-ground remains of the monastic church which originally occupied the site (there are further remains in what is now the basement). The building overlooks the ancient ruins of St. Mary's Priory and Cathedral, which are Grade I listed. The school itself moved in 1964.	1076589	Old Blue Coat School More images
Numbers 119 to 123 (consecutive)	Upper Spon Street, Spon End	House	15th century	7 March 1991	SP3258179057; 52°24′31″N 1°31′21″W	A row of 15th-century houses with later additions and restorations. The buildings are timber-framed, but alterations are cement rendered or brick. The buildings were originally the property of Coventry Priory and were acquired by the Coventry Mercers' Guild in the 16th century. The buildings were sold in the 17th century and successive owners have used them as private residences or businesses. Number 123 was formerly the Black Swan pub.	1226523	Numbers 119 to 123 (consecutive) More images
Stoke St Michael's Church	Walsgrave Road, Stoke	Church	14th century	5 February 1955	SP3580879459; 52°24′43″N 1°28′30″W	Mediaeval church with later additions. The tower was added later in the 14th or 15th century and an extension was built in the late 19th century in the original 14th-century style.	1076574	Stoke St Michael's Church More images
St Laurence's Church	Old Church Road, Foleshill	Church	12th century	5 February 1955	SP3535582577; 52°26′24″N 1°28′53″W	Mediaeval church with later additions. The nave roof was rebuilt in 1614, the nave itself underwent significant restoration in 1784, and the chancel was rebuilt in 1792. Other work was undertaken at different times throughout the 19th and 20th centuries. The church was bombed in an air raid in October 1940 and the nave was again rebuilt and other restoration work undertaken. The church re-opened in 1942. The surviving parts of the mediaeval church, and the variety of different materials used in successive rebuilds and restorations are of particular interest.	1335825	St Laurence's Church More images
Mediaeval Stone Building	Much Park Street, City Centre	Building	Late 13th or early 14th century	5 February 1955	SP3375578728; 52°24′20″N 1°30′19″W	Unidentified rectangular red sandstone building. The roof and one wall have been lost, but the majority of the other three walls survive, one of which includes a pointed arched window. The remains were uncovered by a bomb dropped during a World War II air raid.	1342921	Mediaeval Stone Building More images
Church of St Mary the Virgin	Hall Lane, Walsgrave	Church	1300	5 February 1955	SP3790680883; 52°25′29″N 1°26′38″W	St Mary's was first built in 1300 but significantly rebuilt later in the 13th or 14th century and again in the 19th and 20th centuries. The church consists of a nave with two aisles and a tower, which was added in the 15th century. A large extension (not of special interest) was added in the 1980s.	1115404	Church of St Mary the Virgin More images
War Memorial in Coventry War Memorial Park	Coventry	War Memorial	1925–1927	8 January 2013	SP3285177418; 52°23′38″N 1°31′07″W		1410358	War Memorial in Coventry War Memorial Park More images
3-5 Priory Row	Priory Row	House	Circa 1414	5 February 1955	SP3356378975; 52°24′28″N 1°30′29″W		1076587	3-5 Priory Row More images

== See also ==
- History of Coventry
- Scheduled Ancient Monuments in Coventry
- Grade I listed buildings in Coventry
- Grade II* listed buildings in the West Midlands
