= 22 Bayley Lane =

The Cottage
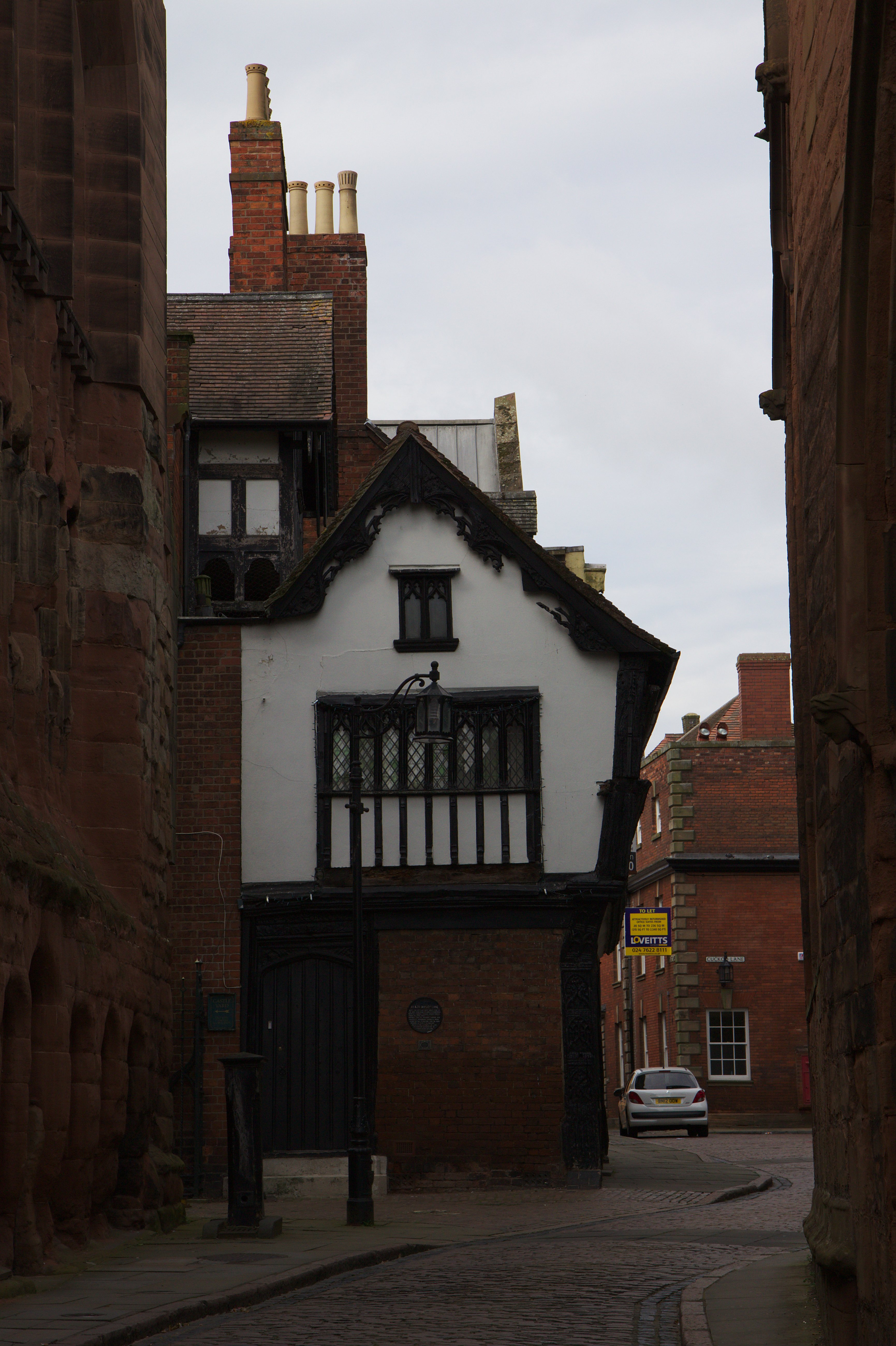
- 22 Bayley Lane is the only remaining mediaeval timber framed house standing in the area
- Interactive map of the The Cottage area

General information
- Location: 22 Bayley Lane, Coventry, England
- Coordinates: 52°24′28″N 1°30′29″W
- Completed: c. 1500

22 Bayley Lane (also known as The Cottage) is a grade II* listed building and only remaining mediaeval timber framed building in the Cathedral Quarter area of Coventry, where there were at one time a great many.

== History ==
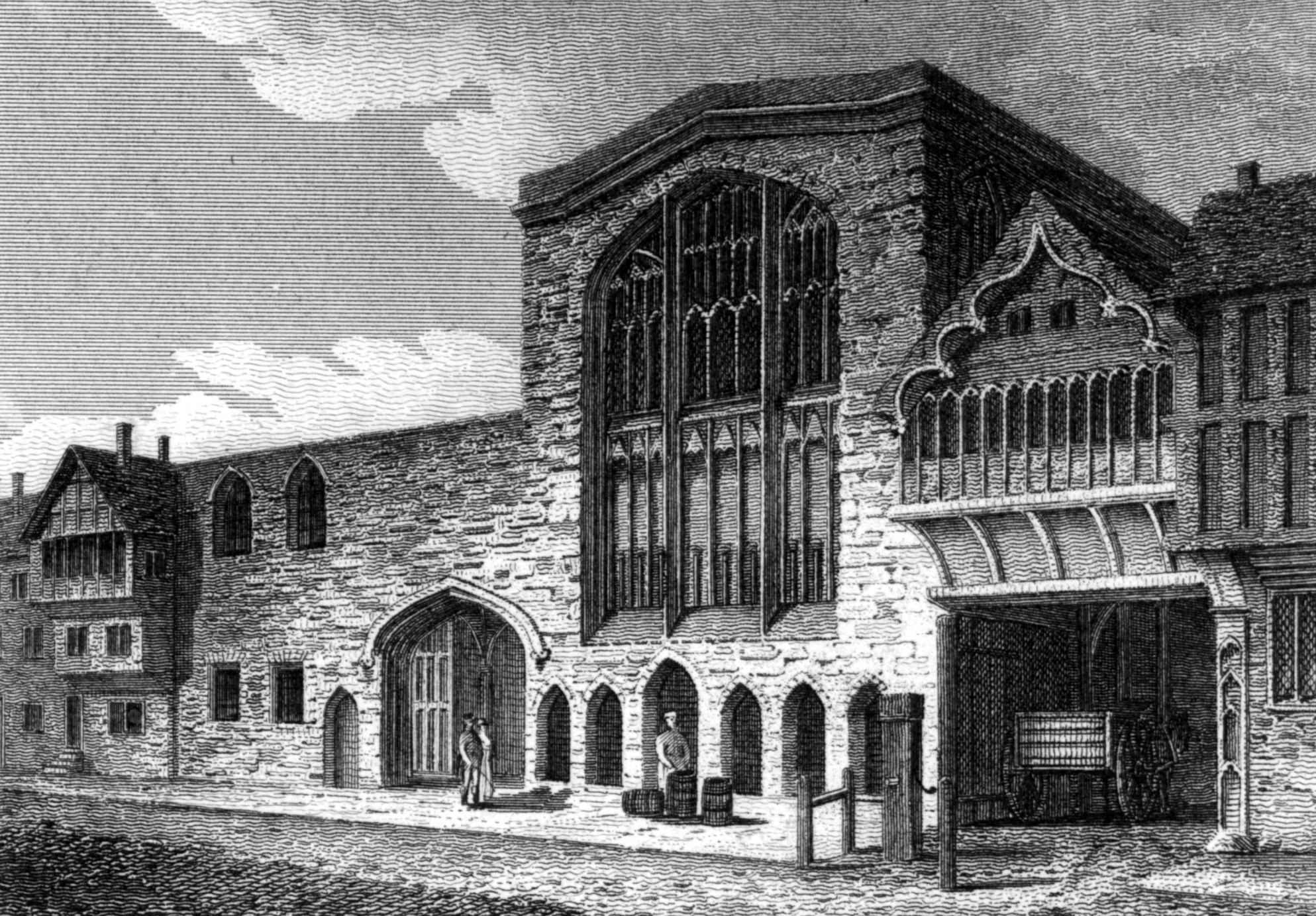
22 Bayley Lane as seen in 1812

The building may have been constructed as the rebuilding of a house which previously stood there, thought to be called the Castle Bakehouse.

22 Bayley Lane was formerly connected to St Mary's Guildhall by a first floor extension.

== Architecture ==
22 Bayley Lane would have been one of a row of cottages of its type when it was built in the early 16th century. Other work from this time of this quality can be found at Ford's Hospital and Bond's Hospital. The chimneys were added to the building in the 17th century and the shop window is early 19th century.

== Bibliography ==
- Stephens, W.B., ed. (1969). A History of the County of Warwick: Volume 8: The City of Coventry and Borough of Warwick. Victoria Country History.
