= Stone House, Allesley =

16th century sandstone farmhouse in Coventry

Stone House
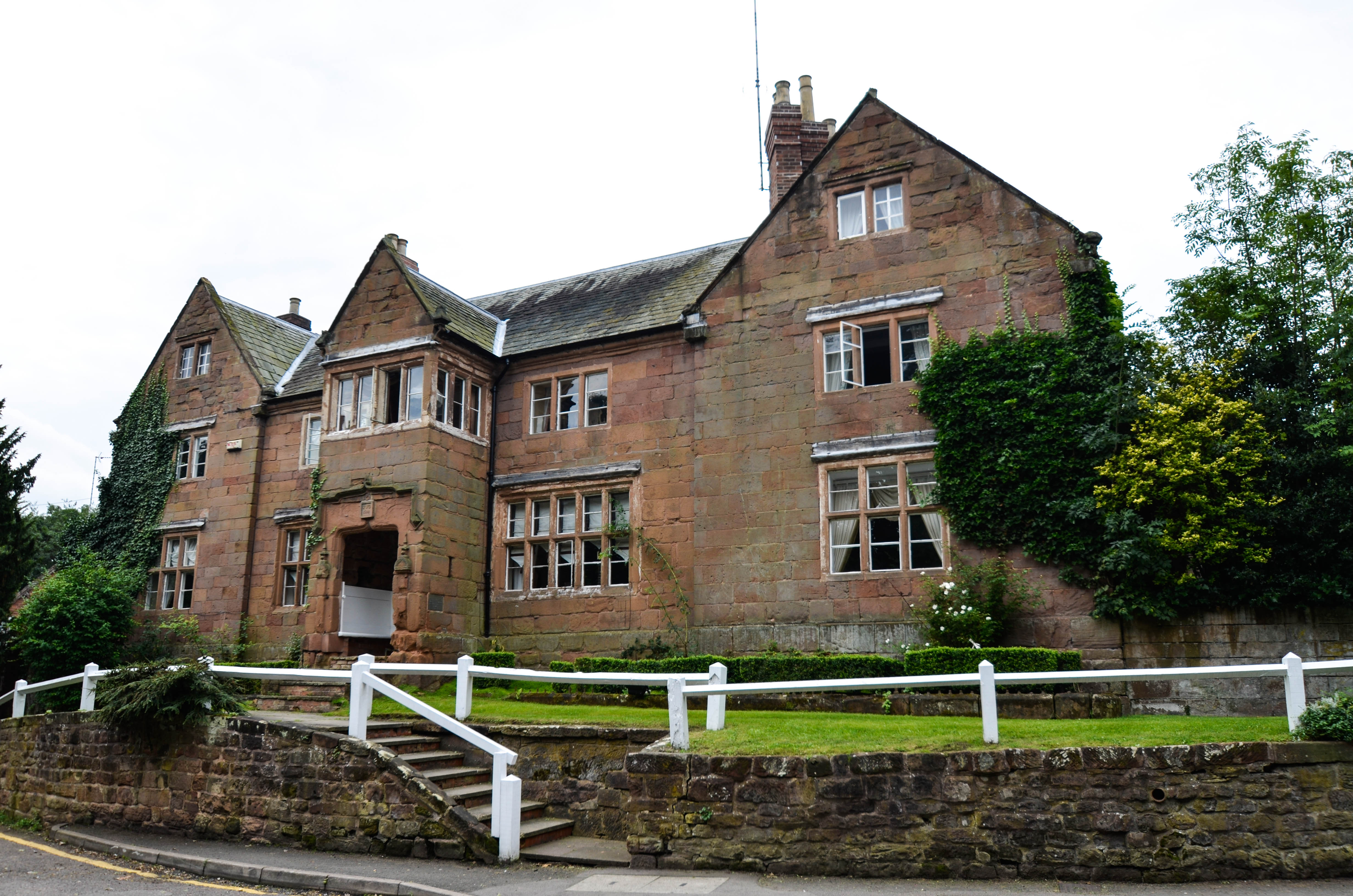
- The south elevation of Stone House
- Interactive map of Stone House
- Type: Farmhouse
- Location: 65 Birmingham Road, Allesley, Coventry, England
- Coordinates: 52.42252°N 1.55859°W
- Built: c. 1557

Listed Building – Grade II*
- Official name: 65, Birmingham Road
- Designated: 5 February 1955
- Reference no.: 1076663

Stone House is a 16th-century sandstone house on Birmingham Road in Allesley, Coventry. It is Grade II* listed for a number of architectural features, as well as its good condition.

== History ==
Stone House was built in c.1557 for John Milward. The freehold was bought from him in 1608 by a new owner who had the initials "WNC" and the date carved in a tablet over the porch. The building was Grade II* listed on 24 June 1974.

The Stone House is one of the oldest houses in Allesley Village and is reputed to be on the original site of the Pack-horse Gatehouse of the Allesley castle.

== Architecture ==
The house contains features from various phases of building work through the 16th and 17th centuries. There is an original 16th century doorway at the rear of the house, and an ashlar plinth from this period surrounds the main block of the house. The north wing is rendered with roughcast, which may have originally been used on the whole building. The front section of the house is now bare sandstone. The garden is walled with 16th and 17th century elements, and the gate piers bear 18th century ball finials.

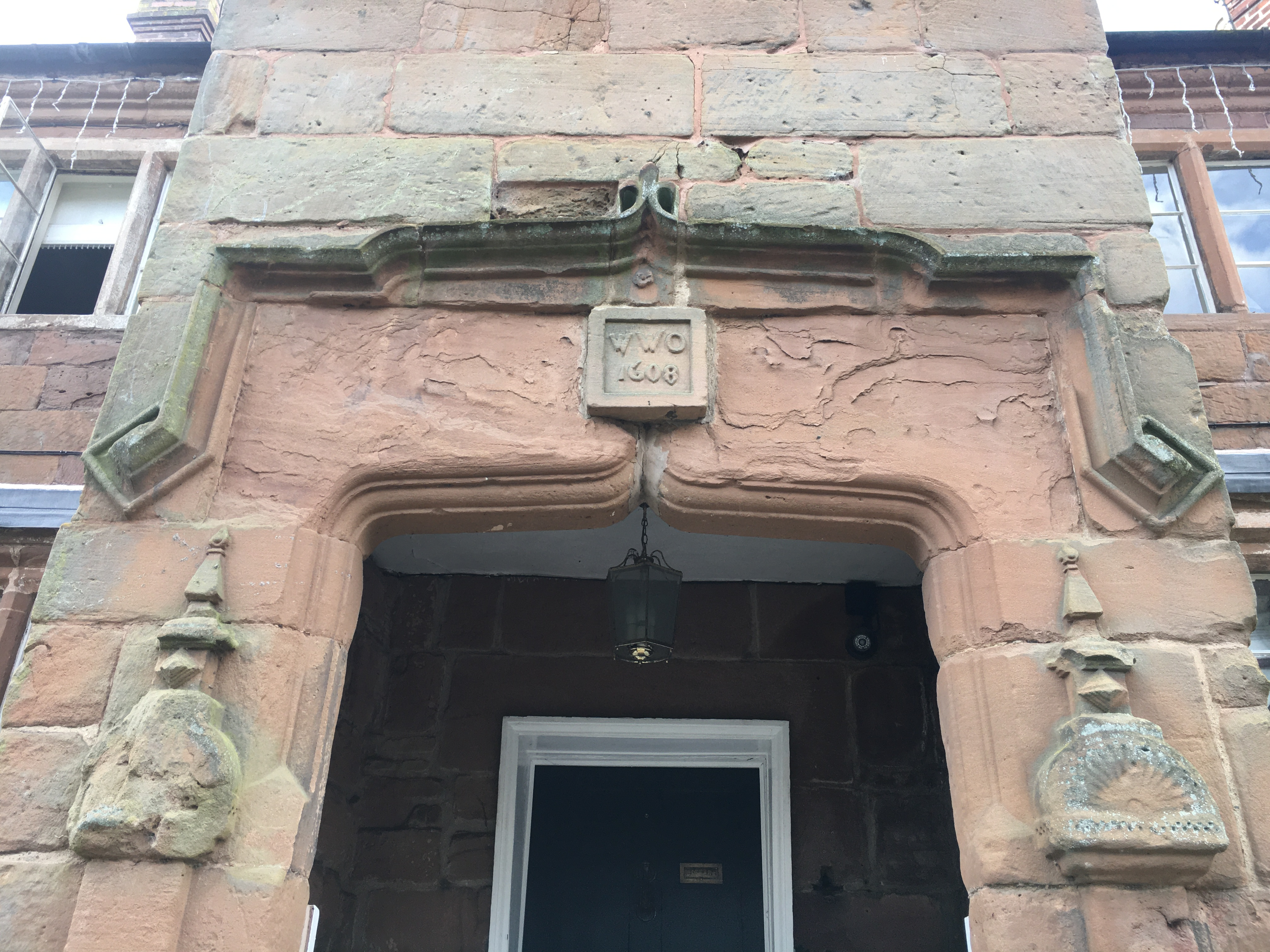
Detail of the stonework on the front porch, including inscribed tablet

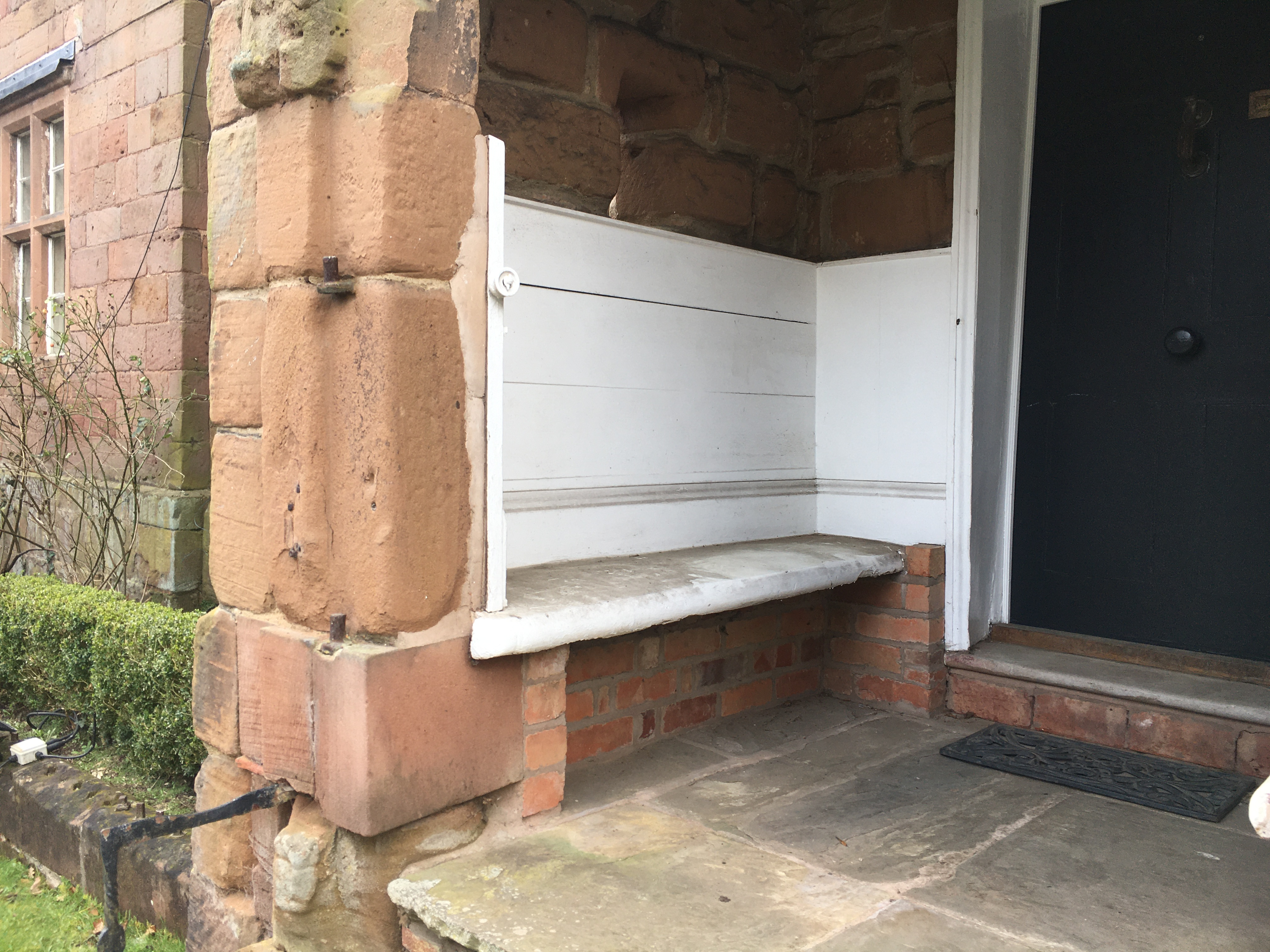
Detail of the built-in seating in the front porch

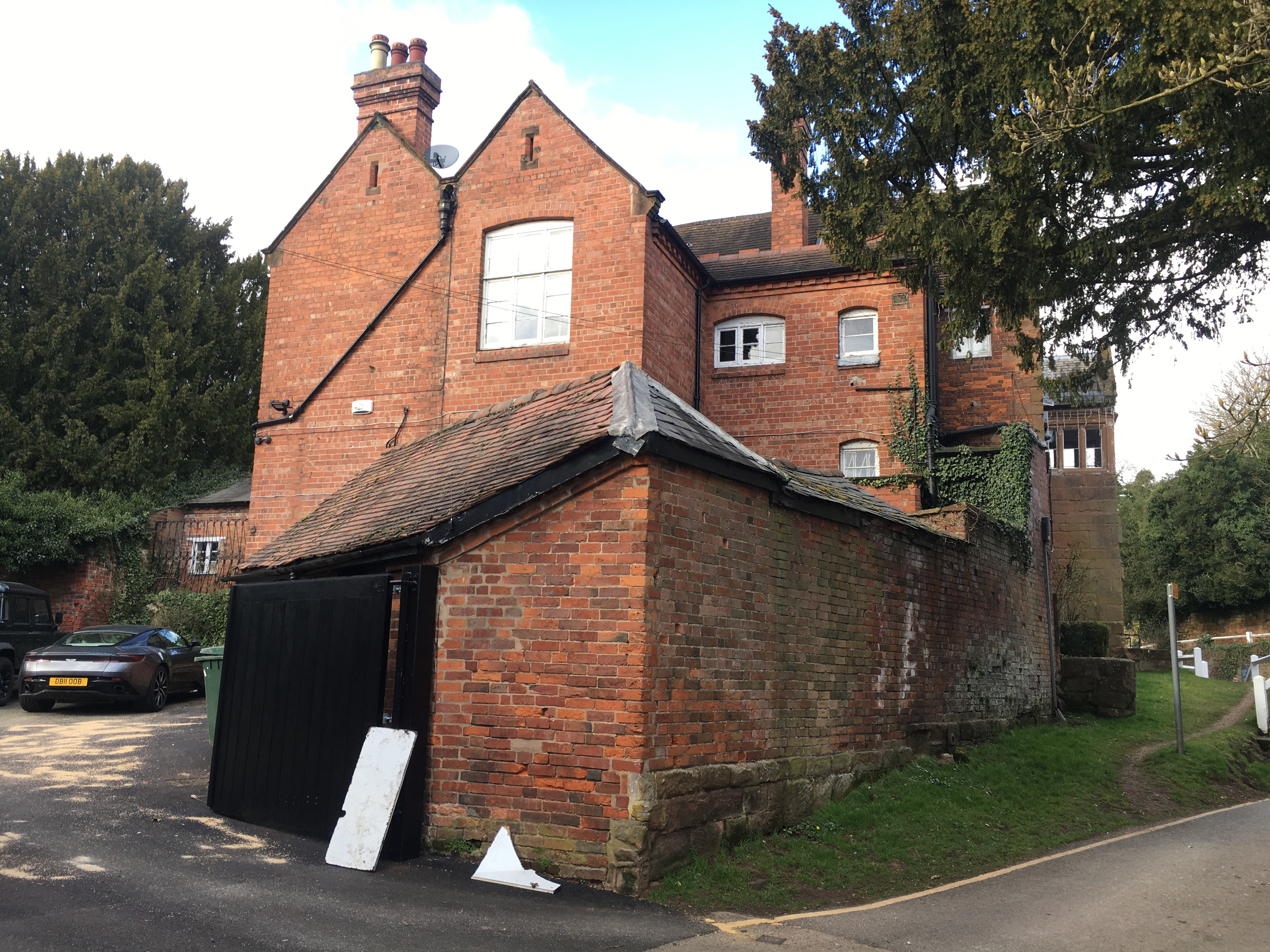
A view of the west elevation of the house, showing later brickwork additions

== See also ==
- Golden Cross Inn, Coventry - another Grade II* listed building of a similar age in Coventry
- Ford's Hospital, Coventry - a Grade I listed half-timbered almshouse in the city centre, also 16th century
