= Kirby House, Coventry =

House in Coventry, West Midlands, England

Kirby House
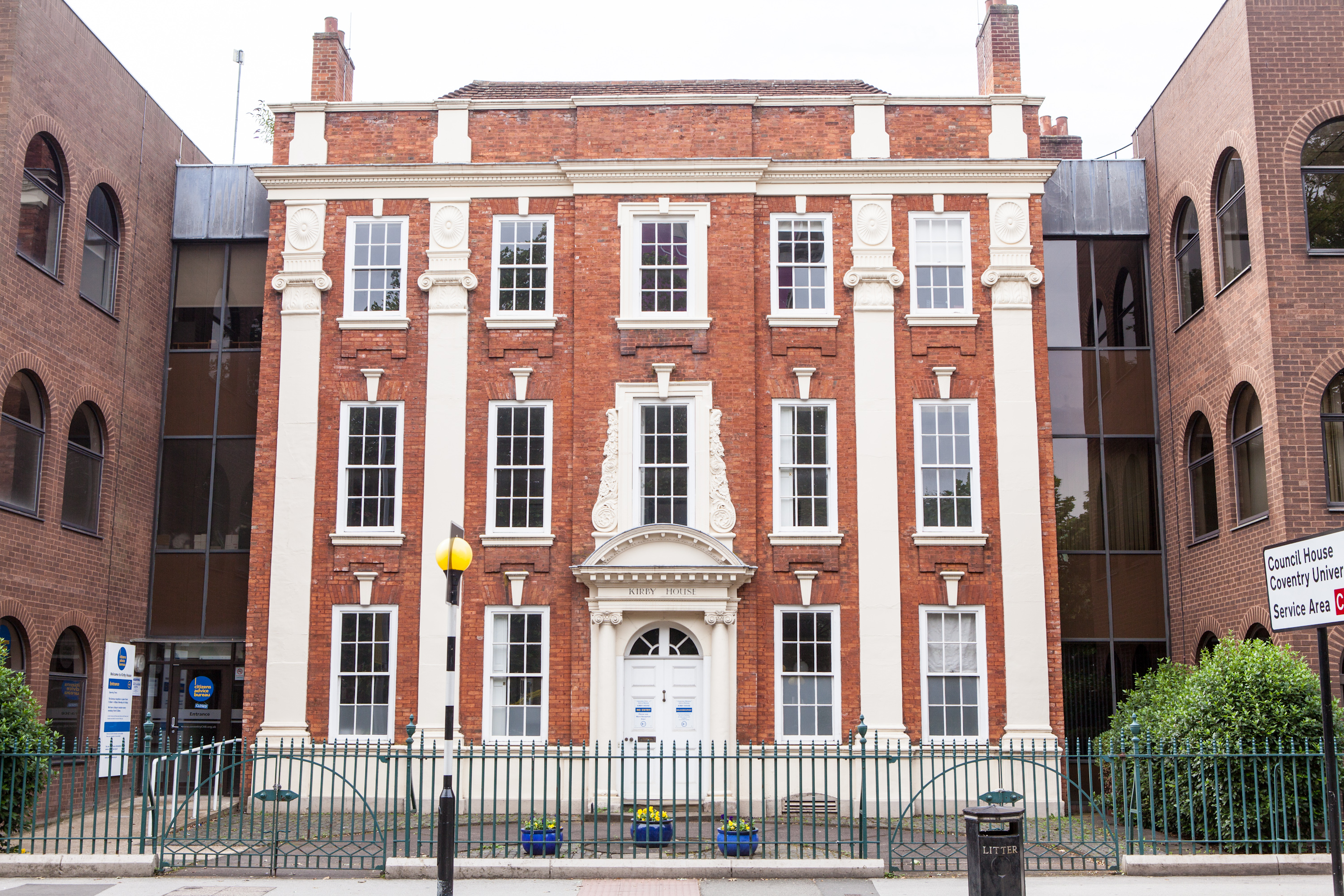
- Kirby House in 2012
- Interactive map of the Kirby House area

General information
- Architectural style: Georgian
- Location: 16 Little Park Street, Coventry, England
- Coordinates: 52.40615°N 1.50880°W
- Completed: c. 1735
- Renovated: 1981–1982

16 Little Park Street (also known as Kirby House) is a Georgian townhouse (Grade II* listed) in central Coventry, West Midlands, England. It is one of two remaining Georgian buildings on the street and three in the city centre (the other two being 7 Little Park Street and 11 Priory Row). The name Kirby House comes from Thomas Hulston Kirby, a solicitor and clerk to the county's magistrates, who bought it in 1874. It was built by Richard Bird (1690–1725), who was born and died in Coventry.

As of August 2024, the building is occupied by the Central England Law Centre

== History ==
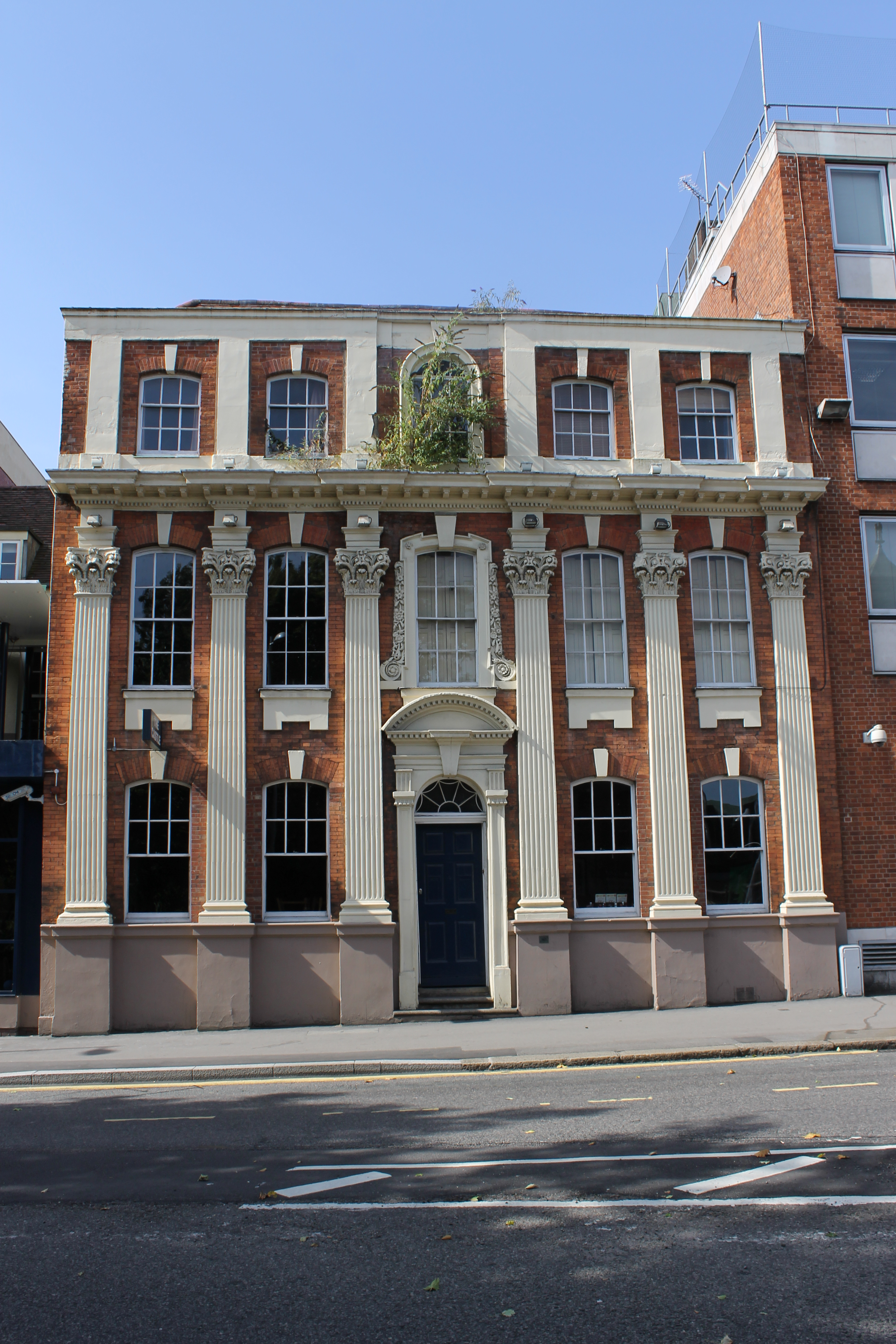
7 Little Park Street was built around the same time.

The front of the house dates back to around 1735, but the façade may have been taken from an earlier building.

The building received slight damage during the Coventry Blitz. The interior was completely restored from 1980 to 1982.

== See also ==
- Grade II* listed buildings in Coventry
