= St Laurence's Church, Coventry =

Church in Coventry, England

- St Laurence's
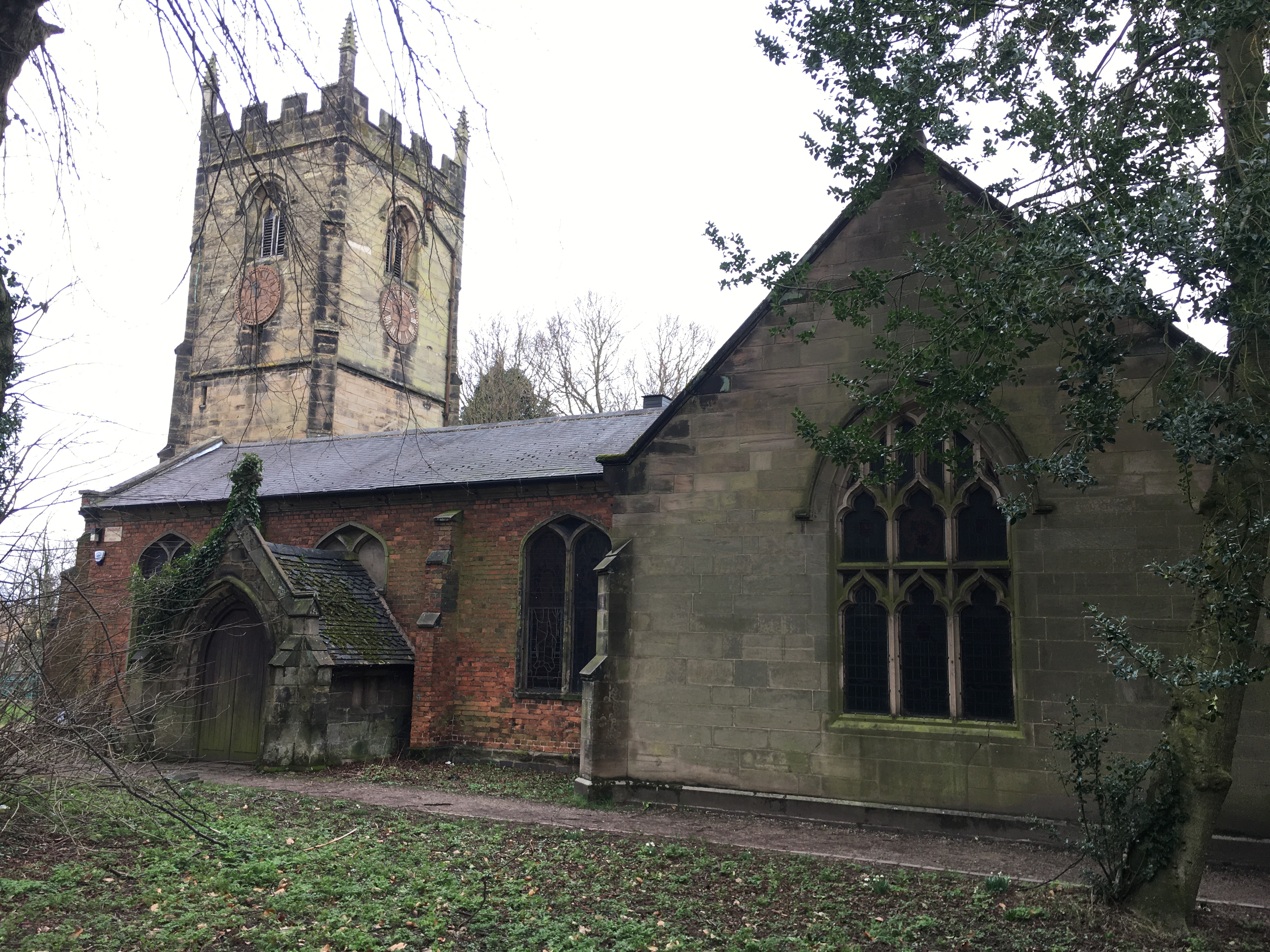
- A view of St Laurence's Church from the south
- St Laurence's Church, Coventry
- 52.44001°N 1.48137°W
- OS grid reference: SP 35355 82577
- Location: Old Church Road, Foleshill, Coventry CV6 7ED
- Country: England
- Denomination: Church of England

History
- Status: Active
- Dedication: St Laurence

Architecture
- Functional status: Parish church

Administration
- Diocese: Coventry
- Archdeaconry: Coventry
- Parish: Foleshill

Clergy
- Rector: The Revd Gareth Irvine

Listed Building – Grade II*
- Official name: Church of St Lawrence
- Designated: 5 February 1955
- Reference no.: 1335825

St Laurence's is the Church of England parish church of Foleshill, Coventry. It is a Grade II* listed building with features, including the tower, from the 15th century. It is located on Old Church Road (B4082) to the north-east of Coventry city centre.

== History ==
The first place of worship to occupy the site is thought to be a small chapel provided by Lady Godiva. Both she and her husband Leofric, Earl of Mercia paid for many religious buildings in the region. After the Norman Conquest, the Anglo-Saxon chapel was replaced by one of sandstone in c.1150. The tower and north aisle were added in the 15th and 16th centuries respectively. The Norman ashlared sandstone chancel was replaced in 1782 with one of brick containing a Palladian window. This window was replaced with a stained glass rose in the 19th century, the south aisle and vestry also date from this period. In the 20th century a choir vestry and south transept were added, and extensive repairs were carried out after incendiary bomb damage in the Second World War.

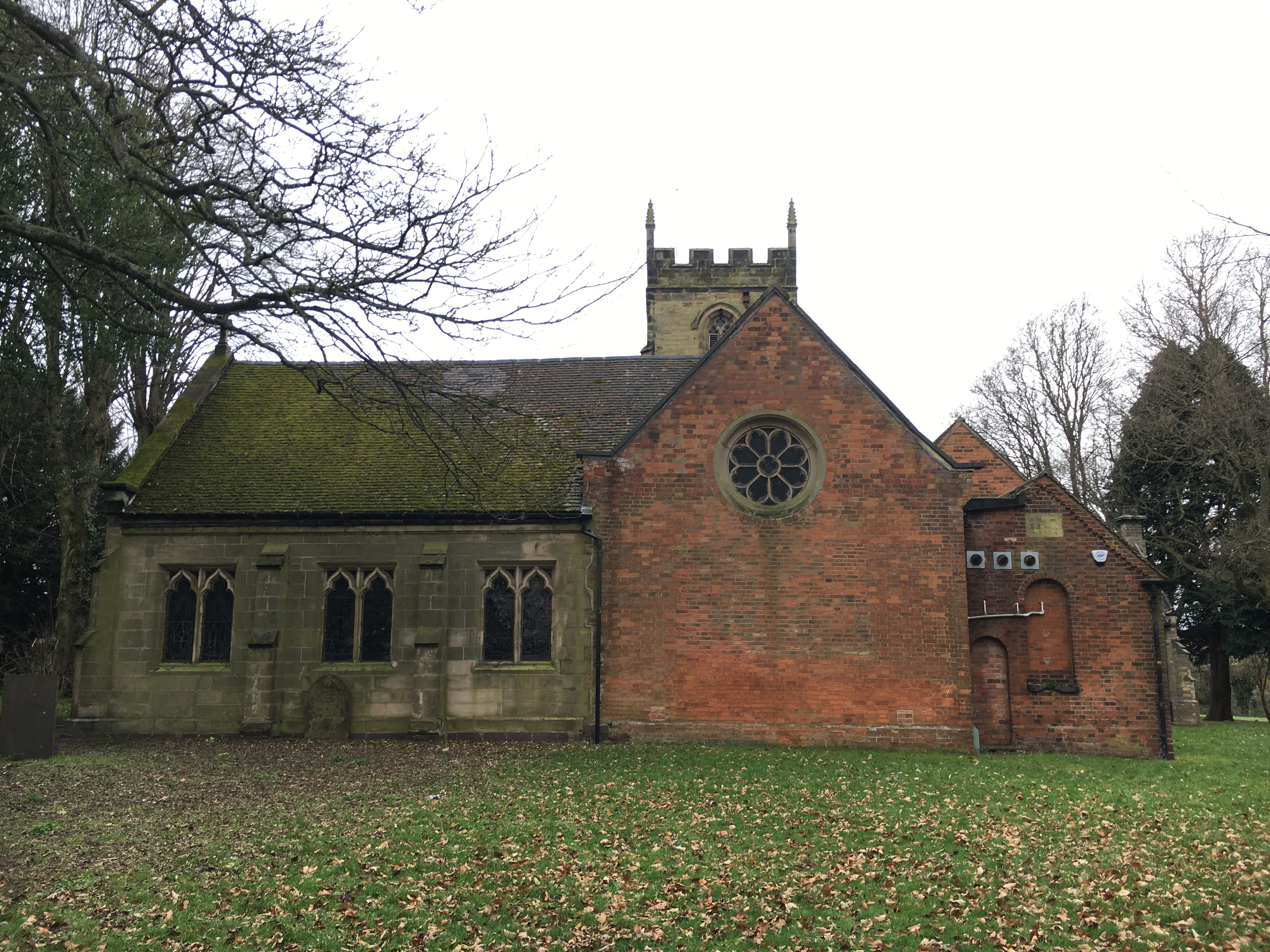
The east elevation of the church, showing the stained glass rose window in the chancel

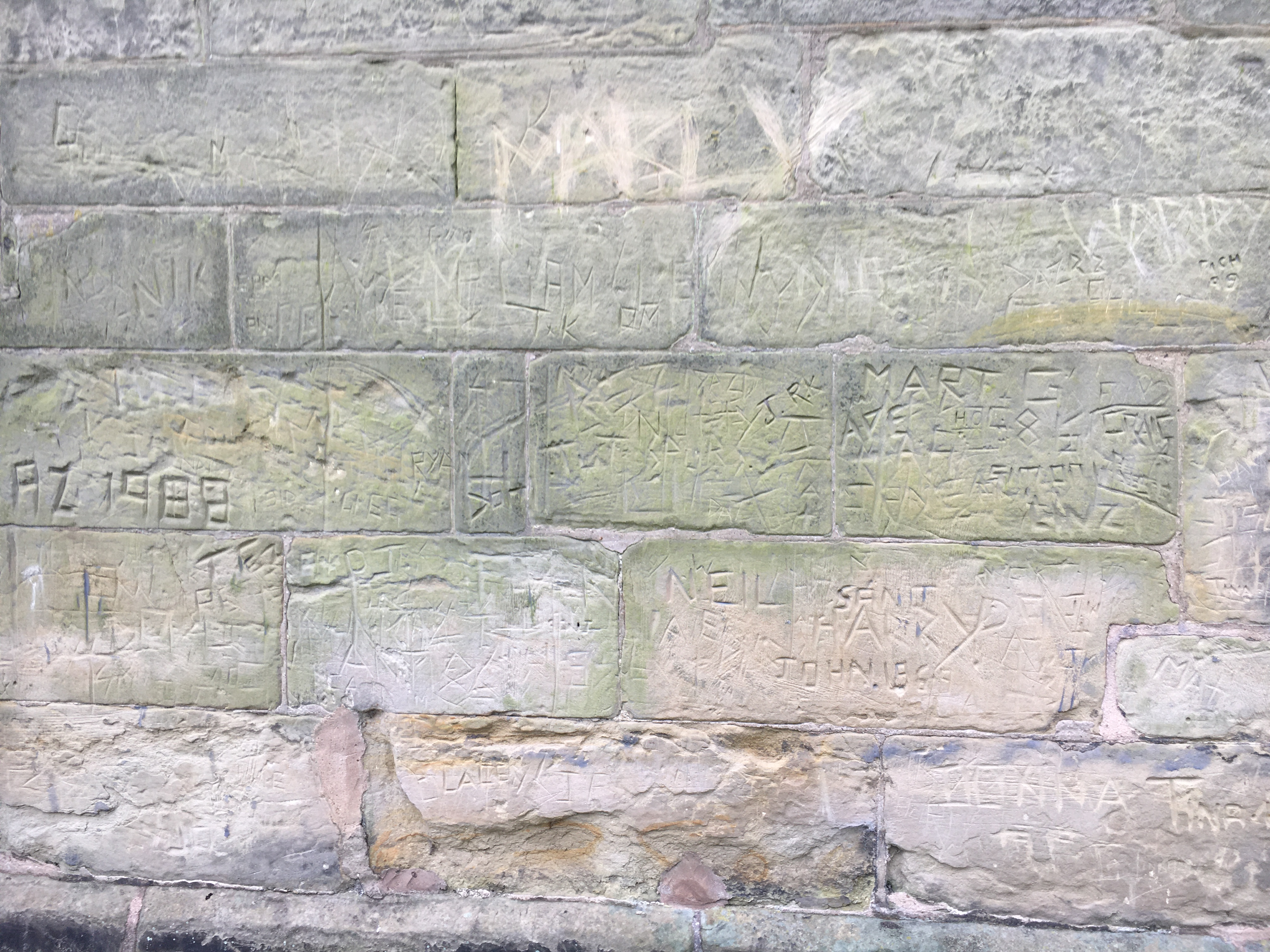
Graffiti inscribed into the soft stone of the north aisle exterior wall

== Interior ==
The church contains the original 12th century font, as well as a 16th century iron bound chest. Also of interest are the cast iron columns added in 1816 with the south aisle.

== Bells ==
There are three bells in the tower, all by Hugh Watts of Leicester. Two of the bells were cast in 1616, with a treble being added in 1635. They are currently in a state of dereliction, having had their wheels removed and stocks braced to the frame. The tenor can be rung half muffled by a rope attached to the clapper.

== See also ==
- Stoke St Michael's Church, Coventry - another Grade II* listed church in Coventry
- St Mary's Priory and Cathedral - a Coventry religious site also founded by Leofric and Godiva
