= St Mary's Church, Walsgrave =

Church in Coventry, West Midlands, England

Church of St Mary the Virgin
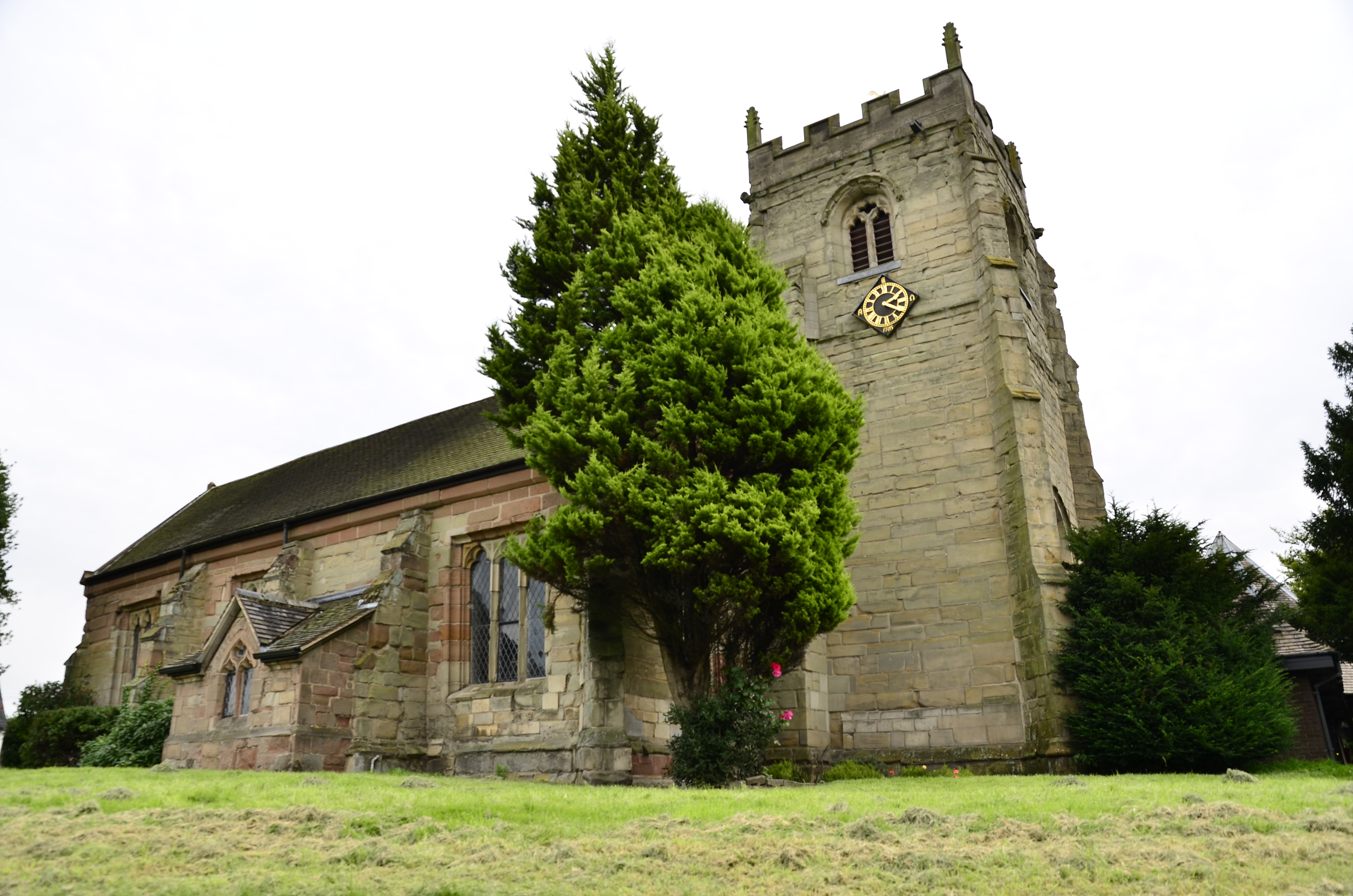

- Location within West Midlands county

General information
- Status: Grade II* listed
- Location: Coventry, England
- Coordinates: 52.4246°N 1.4440°W
- Completed: 1300

The Church of St Mary the Virgin is a church in Walsgrave, in the city of Coventry in the West Midlands of England. The building is Grade II* listed, though churches in ecclesiastical use are exempt from listed building procedures.

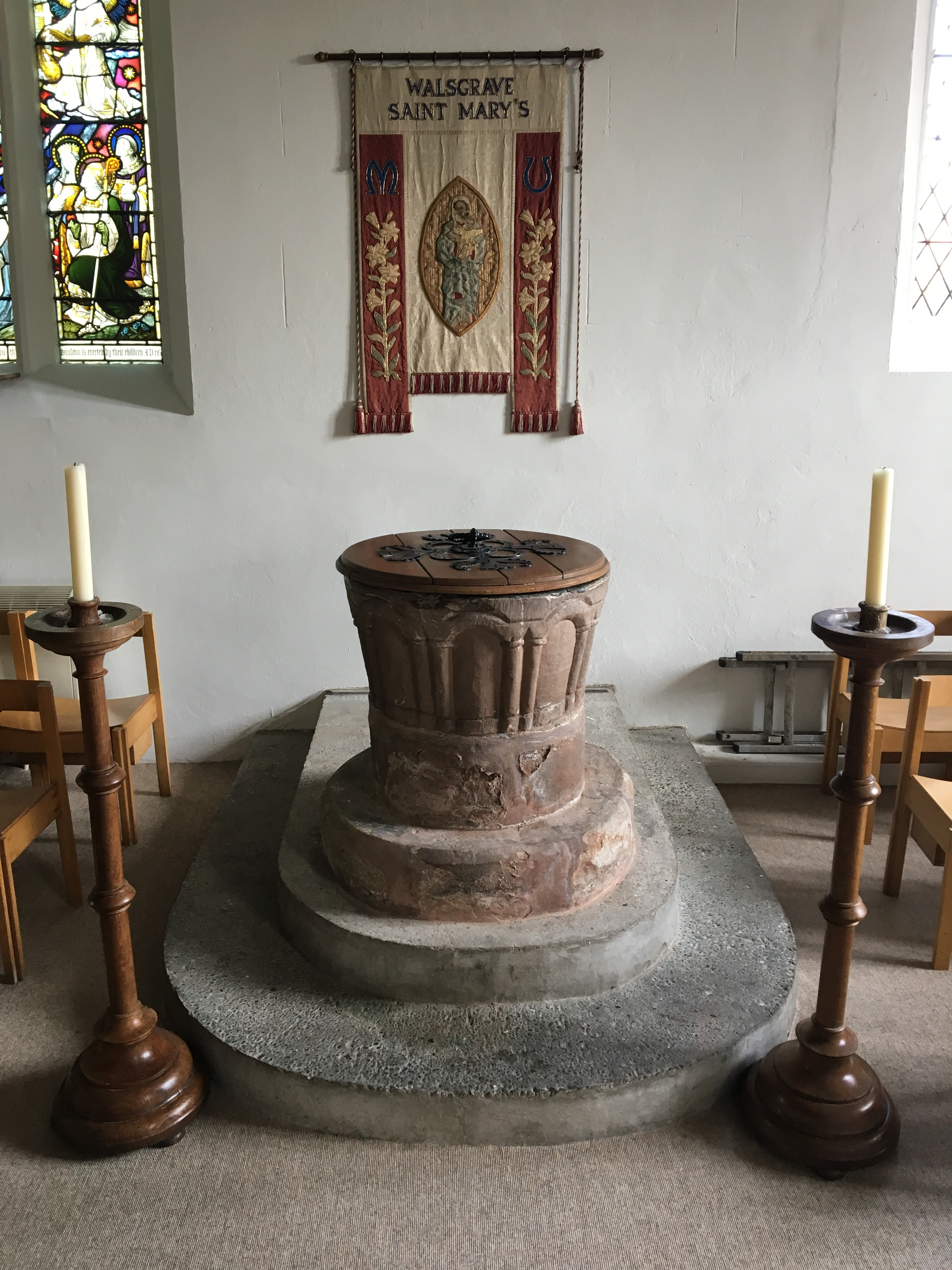
Red sandstone font from the Norman chapel that stood on the site of St Mary's before 1300.

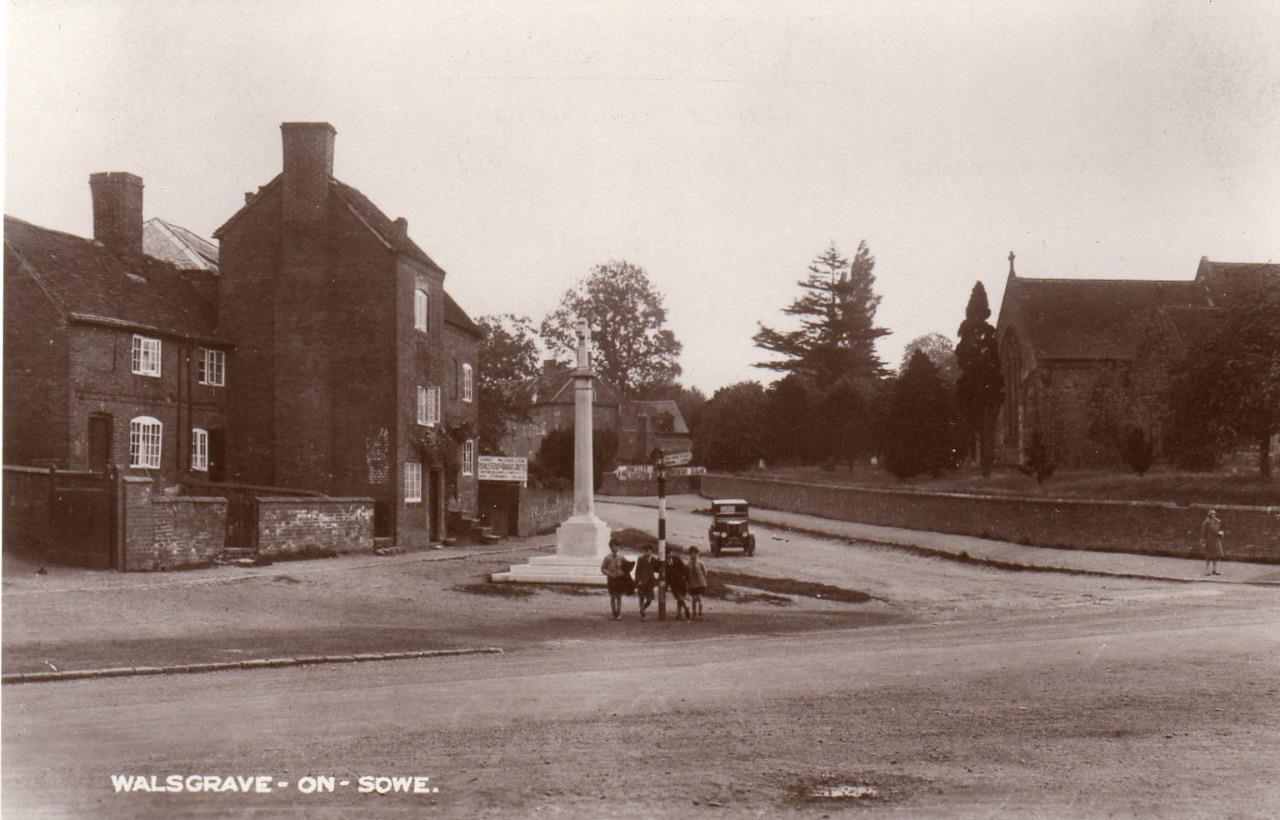
Walsgrave-on-Sowe in the early 1900s, showing the higher wall around the graveyard of St Mary's that was removed in 1951.

A Norman chapel was built at the site in Sowe sometime after 1086. The first known mention of the chapel is in 1221, and St Mary's church is its successor. All that remains of the Norman chapel is the church's font and a pillar capital, both carved from red sandstone.

The church was originally built in 1300, with additions made in the medieval period, and in the 19th and 20th centuries. The original building was composed of local red sandstone, with grey sandstone being added later on. The tower was added in the 15th century. No visible trace of the original church building can be seen in the current structure, and it is possible that the church was completely rebuilt later in the 13th or 14th centuries. Medieval fabrics in the church are particularly of historical interest, as are the 14th-century windows, and other medieval fittings.

In 1951, the wall around the churchyard along the street was removed and the ground within the perimeter leveled and sloped nearly to street level. In the process, coffins interred in the churchyard were removed and reburied on a local farm, and the headstones were either placed upright against the south wall of the churchyard or laid flat around the church grounds.
