= Drapers' Hall, Coventry =

Building in Coventry, England

Drapers' Hall
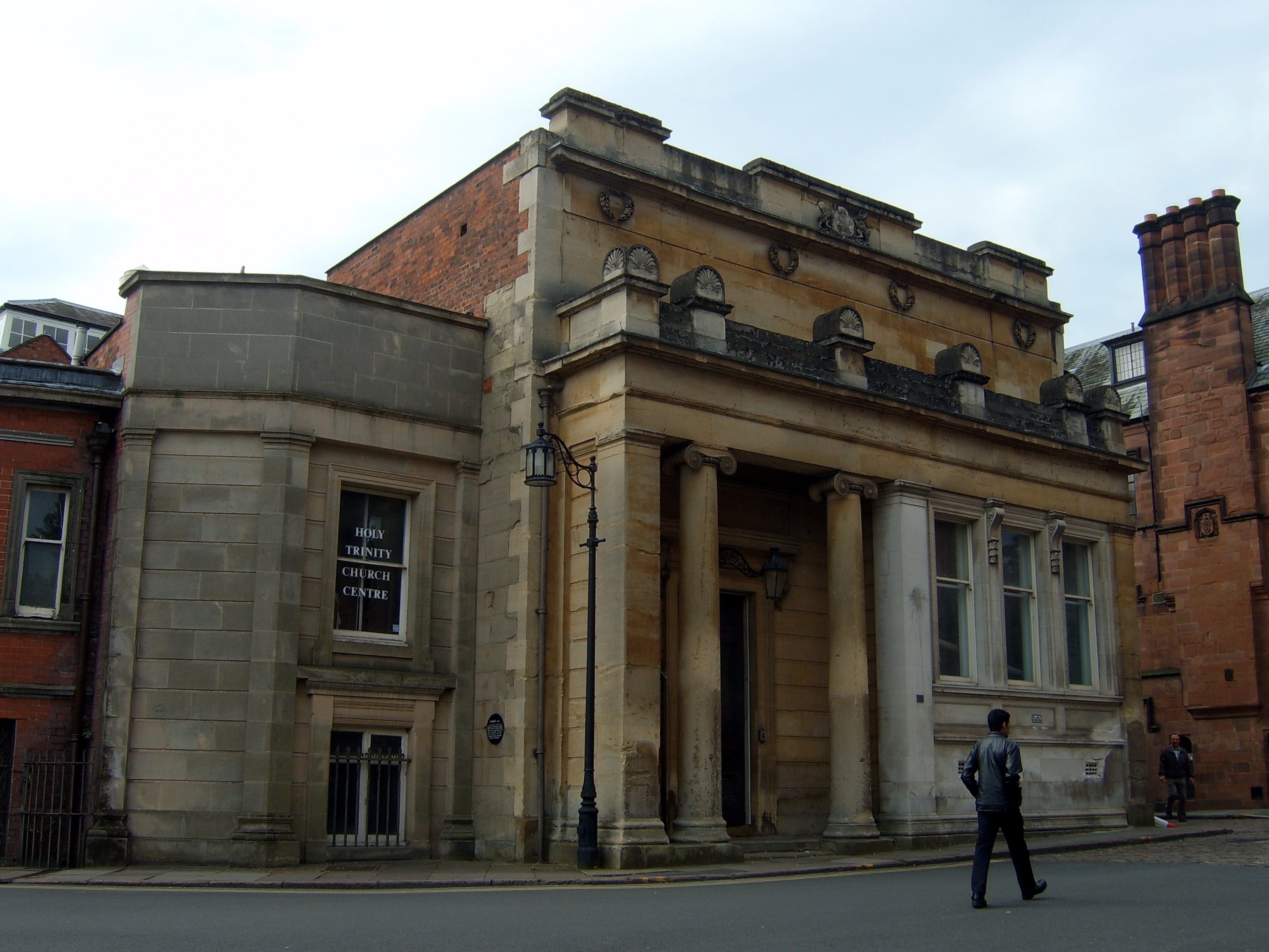
- Drapers' Hall
- Interactive map of the Drapers' Hall area

General information
- Location: Bayley Lane, Coventry
- Coordinates: 52°24′28″N 1°30′26″W
- Construction started: 1831
- Completed: 1832
- Owner: Coventry City Council

Design and construction
- Architect: Thomas Rickman

Drapers' Hall is a historic building (Grade II* listed) in the Cathedral Quarter of Coventry built in 1832 by the Drapers' Company, a large trading guild in Coventry. The present building is believed to the third guildhall on the site.

== History ==
Drapers' Hall was constructed 1831-32 to be the headquarters of the Coventry Drapers' Guild, and an east wing was added in 1864.

The basement of the building was used as an air raid shelter for 200 people during the Second World War.

It was also used as a church centre. In 2012 it was reported that the building would be converted into a music centre.

== Architecture ==
The building is built in Greek Revival style and was designed by Thomas Rickman and Henry Hutchinson.

== Access ==
The building has been opened to the public under the auspices of the Heritage Open Days scheme.

== See also ==
- Grade II* listed buildings in Coventry
- St Mary's Guildhall
