= Bird Grove House =

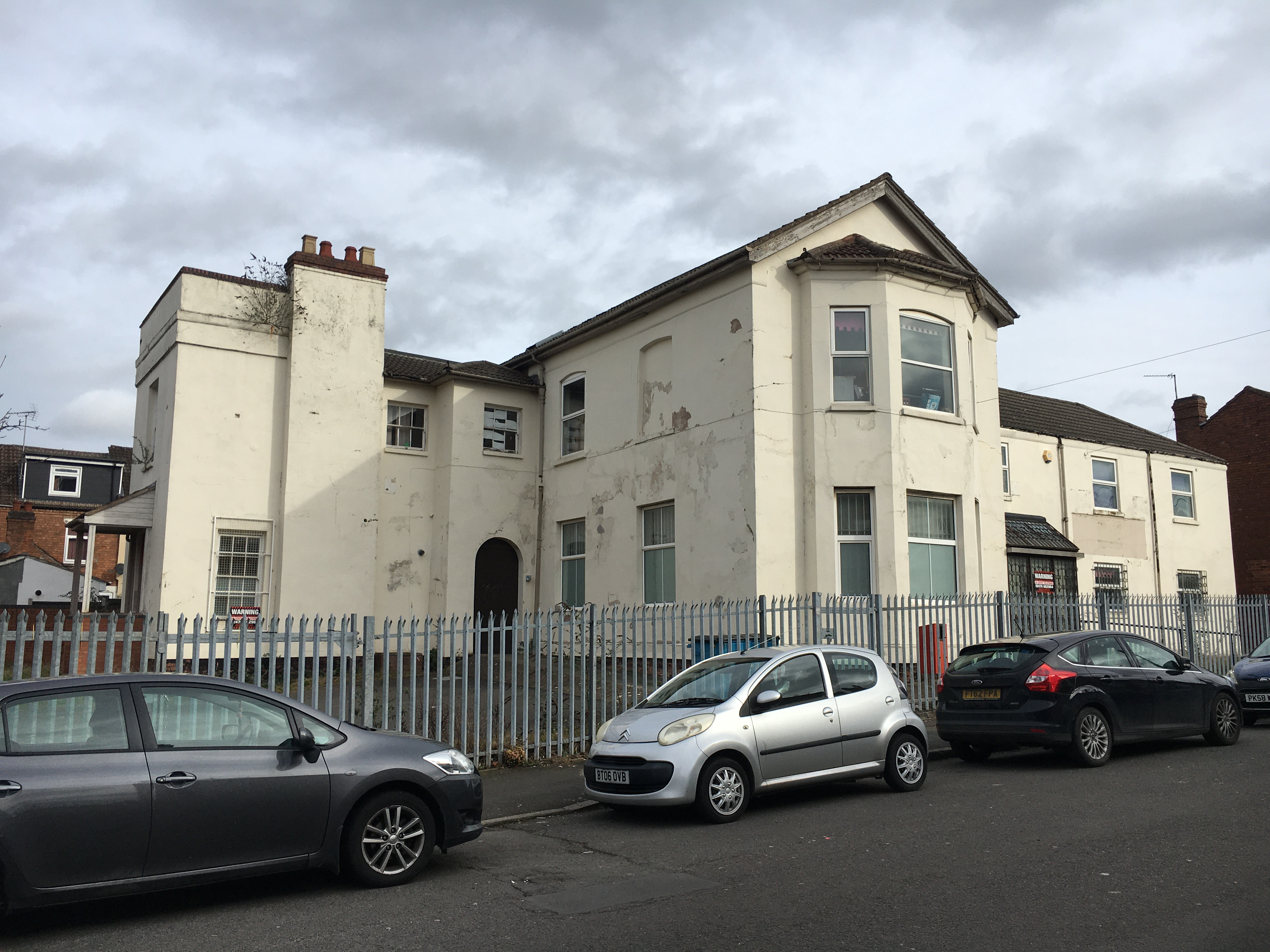
- A view of Bird Grove House from George Eliot Road
- Alternative names: The George Eliot house

General information
- Type: Townhouse
- Address: George Eliot Road, Foleshill
- Town or city: Coventry
- Country: United Kingdom
- Coordinates: 52.42004°N 1.50526°W

Technical details
- Material: Stucco exterior
- Floor count: 2
- Designations: Grade II* listed
- Known for: Dwelling of Mary Ann Evans 1841 - 1849

Bird Grove House, known locally as the George Eliot house, is a two storey stucco house in Foleshill, Coventry. It was occupied by Mary Ann Evans (better known as George Eliot) and her father between 1841 and 1849.

== History ==
Mary Ann Evans accompanied her father, Robert Evans, to the property in Foleshill when he retired in 1841. She lived there as his housekeeper until his death in 1849, when she moved to London. Her time at Bird Grove House greatly influenced her career, as this is where she became acquainted with the Bray family and the “Rosehill Circle” of intellectuals and radicals. The fictional town of Middlemarch that features in her novel of the same name is based on Coventry. The house was Grade II* listed in 1974 because of its connection to Eliot and some of its period features. In more recent times the building was used as a community education centre, but now stands empty. In 2018 it was identified as being “at risk” by the organisation SAVE Britain’s Heritage.

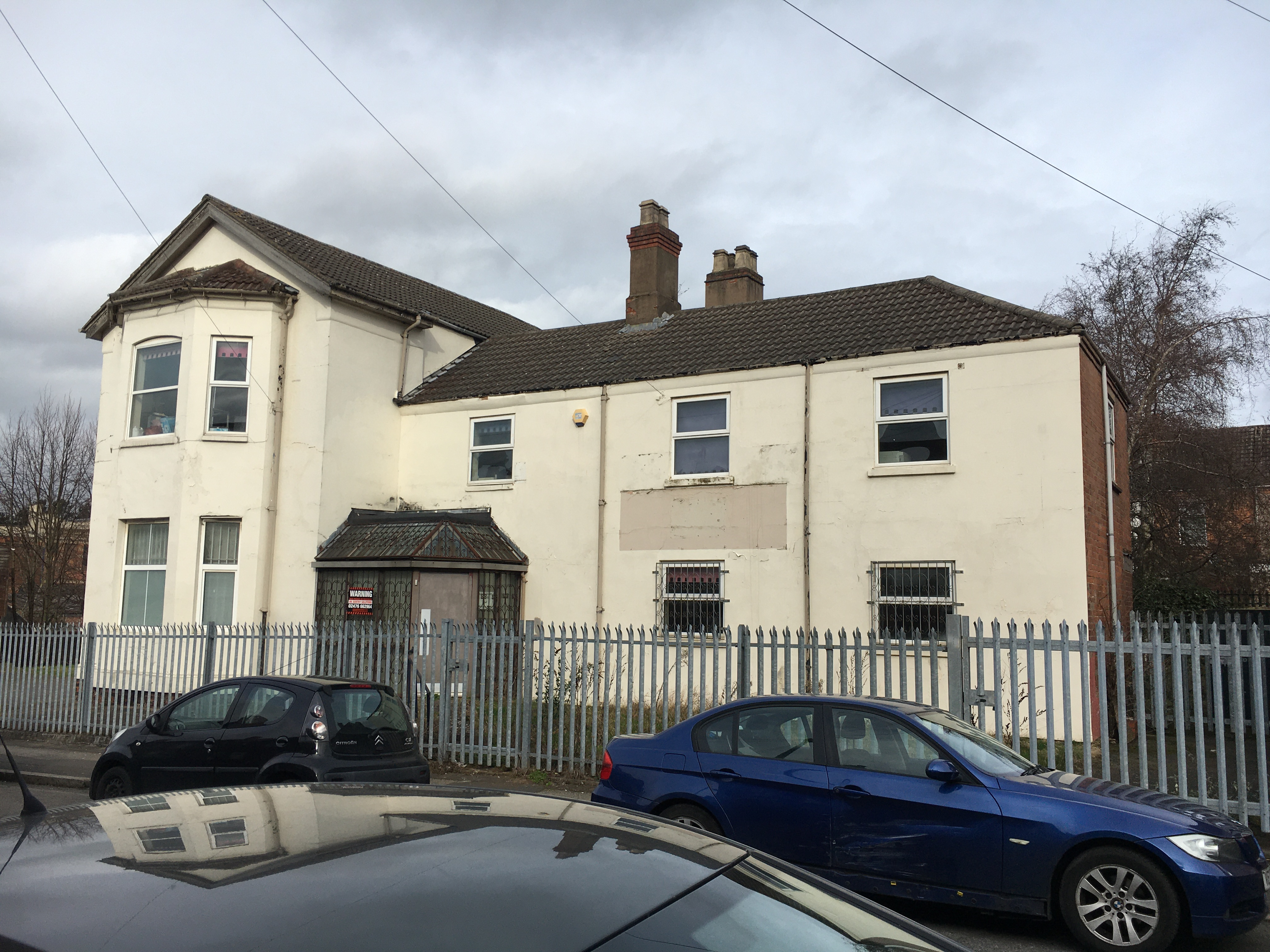
Another view of Bird Grove House from George Eliot Street

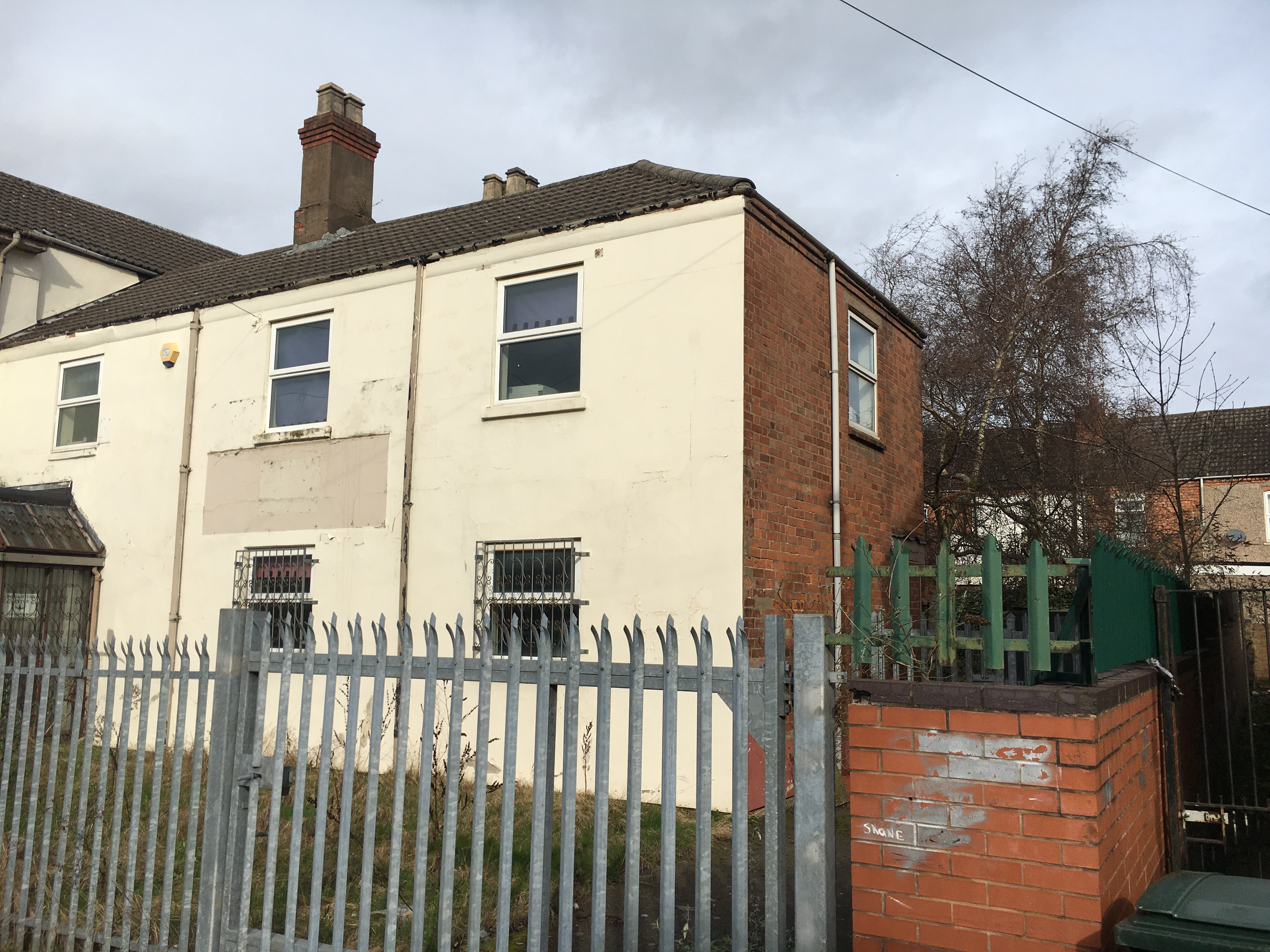
A view of the south east wing, showing the building's brick construction and palisade fence

== See also ==
- Arbury Hall - birthplace of Mary Ann Evans
- Griff House - childhood home
