= Mediaeval Stone Building, Coventry =

Ancient monument in England

Medieval Stone Building
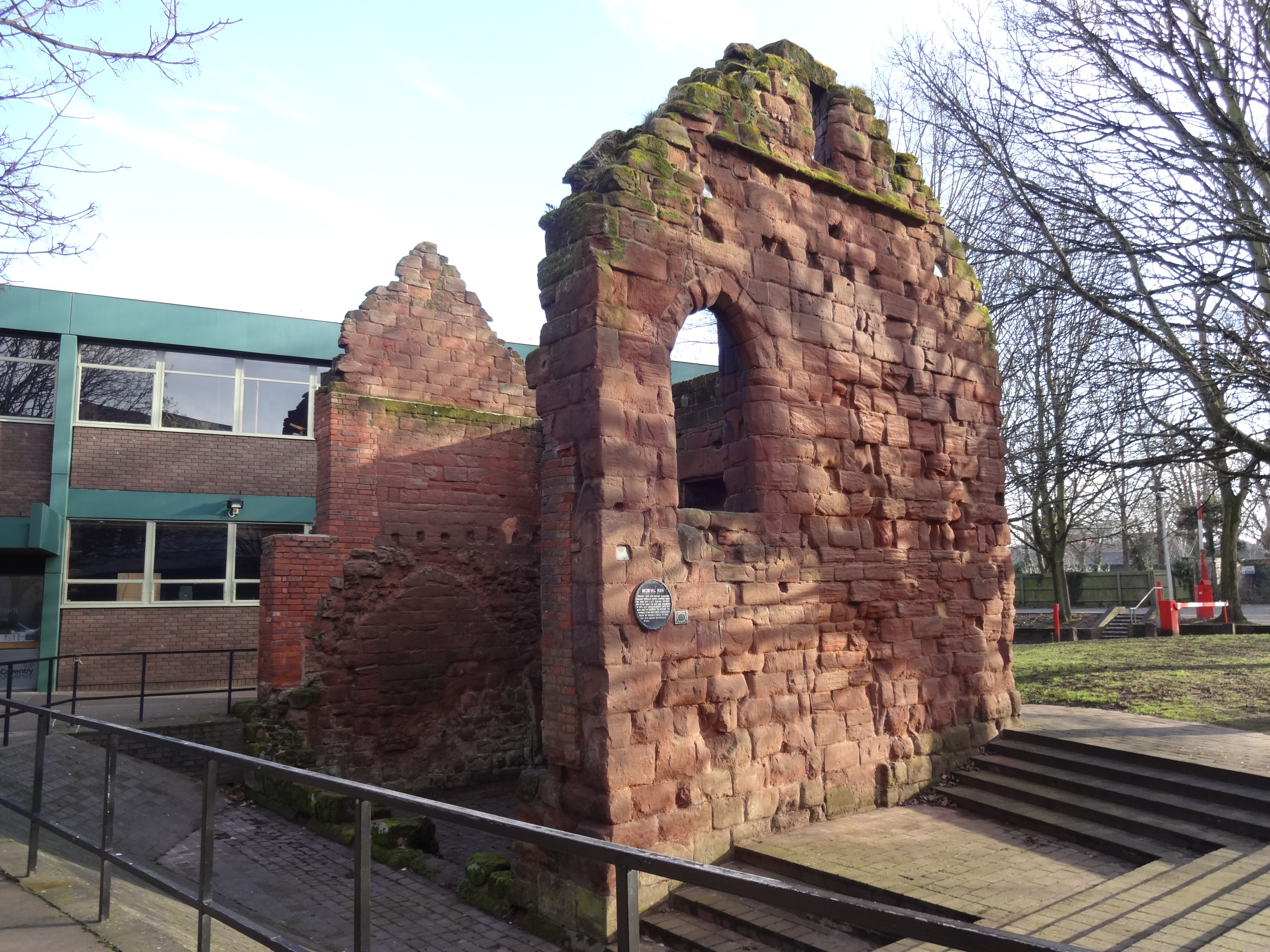
- The three remaining walls of the Mediaeval Stone Building

- Location within West Midlands county

General information
- Status: Grade II* listed
- Location: Much Park Street, Coventry, United Kingdom
- Coordinates: 52.405525°N 1.50525°W
- Completed: 13th or 14th century
- Owner: Coventry City Council

The Medieval Stone Building is an unidentified medieval ruin on Much Park Street, Coventry, in the West Midlands of England. The ruin is a Grade II* listed building; it is believed to have been built in the late 13th or early 14th century and was uncovered by a German bomb during the Coventry Blitz. The building, built from red sandstone, was rectangular; one of the walls contains a single pointed arched window in one wall. The shell of the cellar remains—one of several similar cellars in Coventry city centre including those at 21–22 High Street, Coventry and 38–39 Bayley Lane—as do three of the four walls from the ground floor. However, the vault has been lost.

The building's original purpose is unknown. There is speculation that it may have been associated with the monastery at Whitefriars further along Much Park Street or an independent merchant's house. The site of the building was excavated in 1971: archaeologists discovered pottery from the 13th and 14th centuries.

In 2010, a drain and stake holes were excavated beside a pit containing pieces of iron slag, suggesting the site may have had industrial origins.
