= Old Blue Coat School, Coventry =

Old Blue Coat School
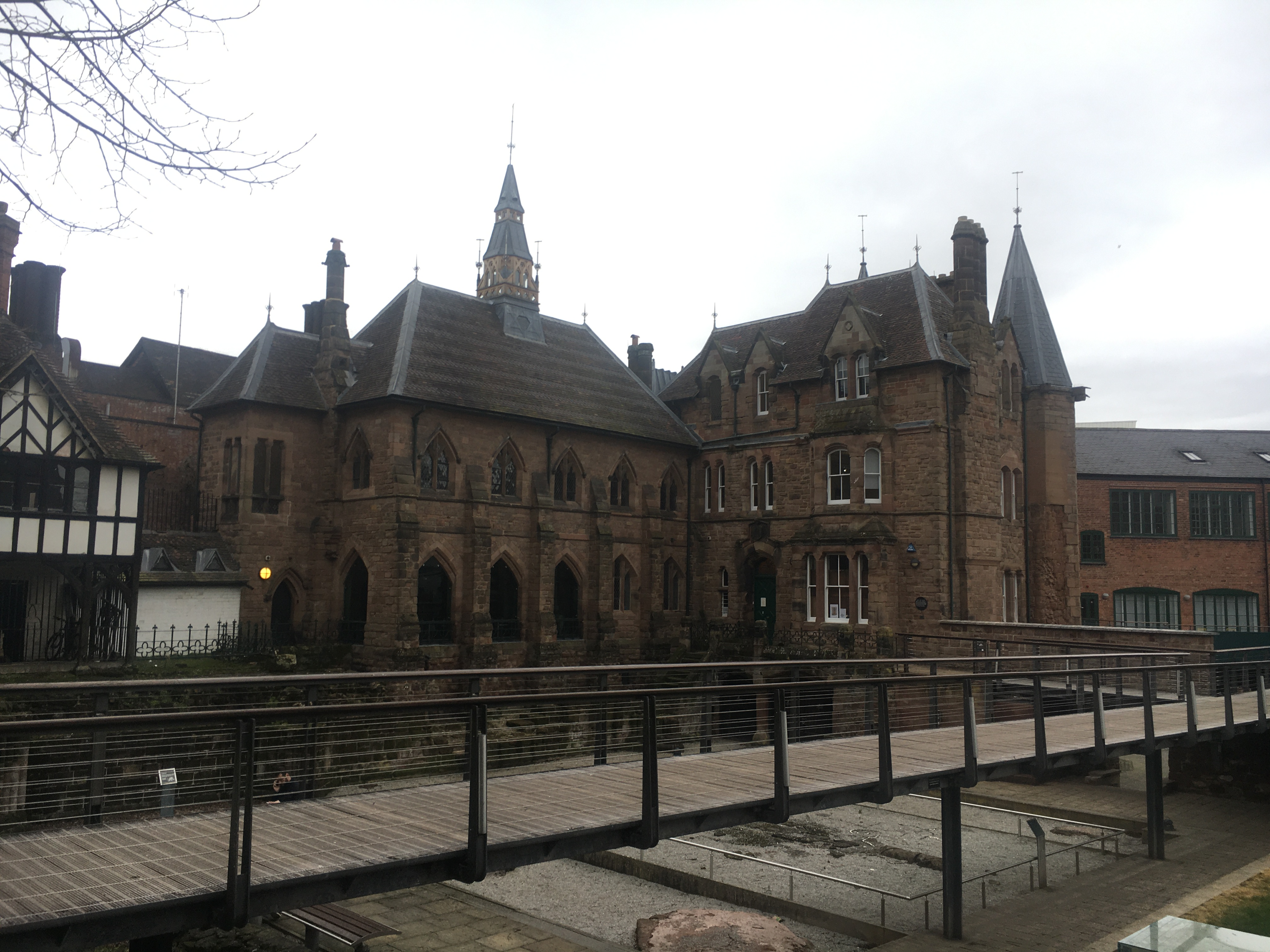
- A view of the Old Blue Coat School from the south east

General information
- Type: School
- Architectural style: Gothic
- Location: Priory Row, Coventry, England
- Coordinates: 52.40908°N 1.50914°W
- Construction started: 1856
- Completed: 1857
- Renovated: 2000
- Owner: Holy Trinity Church, Coventry

Design and construction
- Architect: James Murray
- Designations: Grade II* listed

The Old Blue Coat School is a building in the city centre of Coventry, England. It was built in 1856 on the site of the Priory of St Mary, and is currently used by the Holy Trinity Church.

== History ==
The Blue Coat School was founded in the early 18th century to provide housing, food and education for girls in Coventry until they were 16 years old. It originally occupied the north-west tower of the Priory of St Mary, the only part to survive the Dissolution of the Monasteries. The school buildings were extended and modified through the late 18th and early 19th centuries, but were in poor condition when a major rebuilding took place in 1856–7. The building as it stands today was designed by James Murray in a Gothic style to resemble a French château. The school occupied the building until 1964 when it moved to a new site in Terry Road, Coventry. The building lay empty and fell into disrepair until 2000, when it was renovated for use by the nearby Holy Trinity Church. The building was Grade II* listed on 5 February 1955, for reasons of architectural interest, historical interest and group value with the other buildings on the site of the old priory.

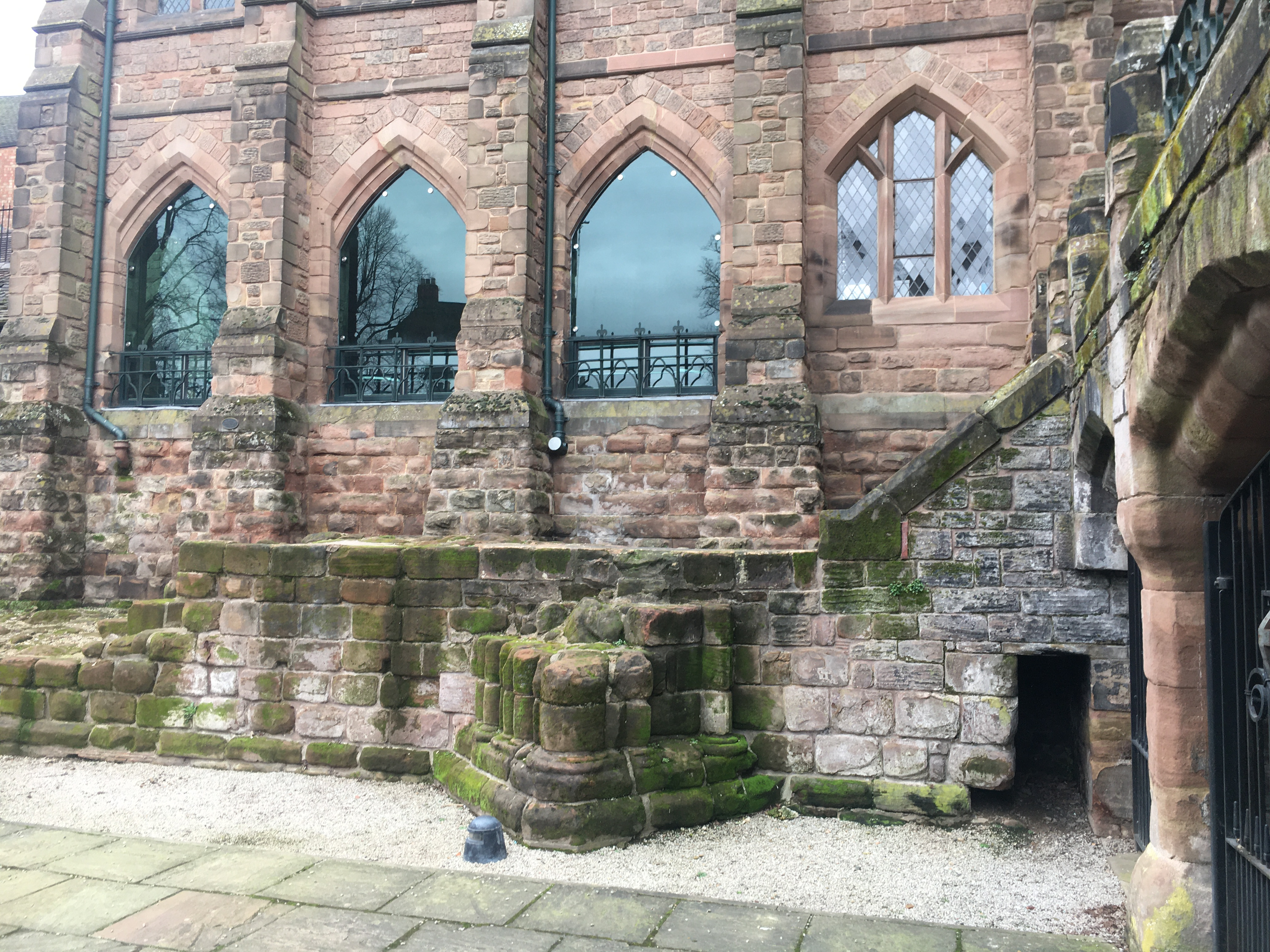
A view of the east elevation, showing the priory remains in the foreground

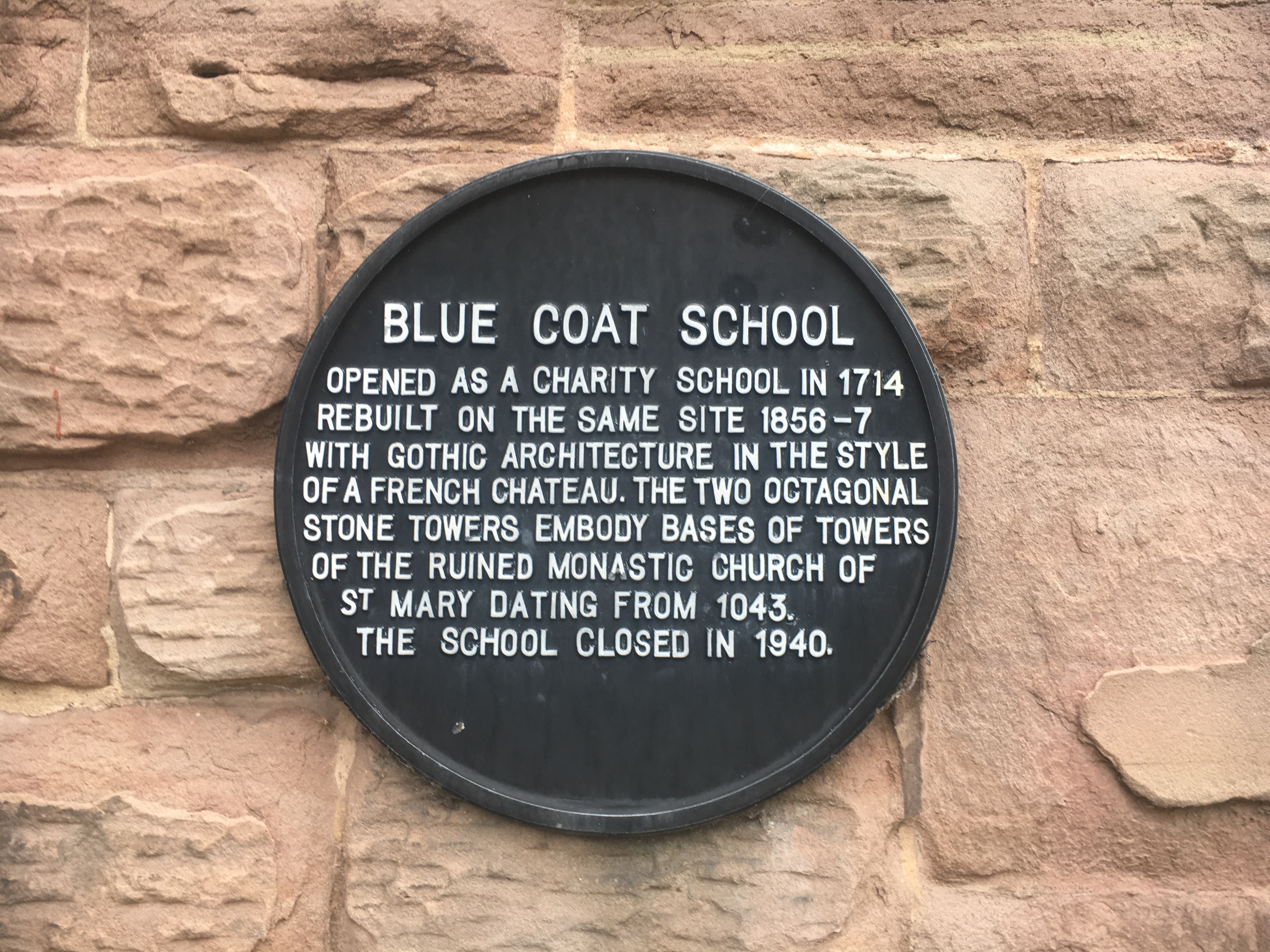
A plaque fixed to the wall of the building

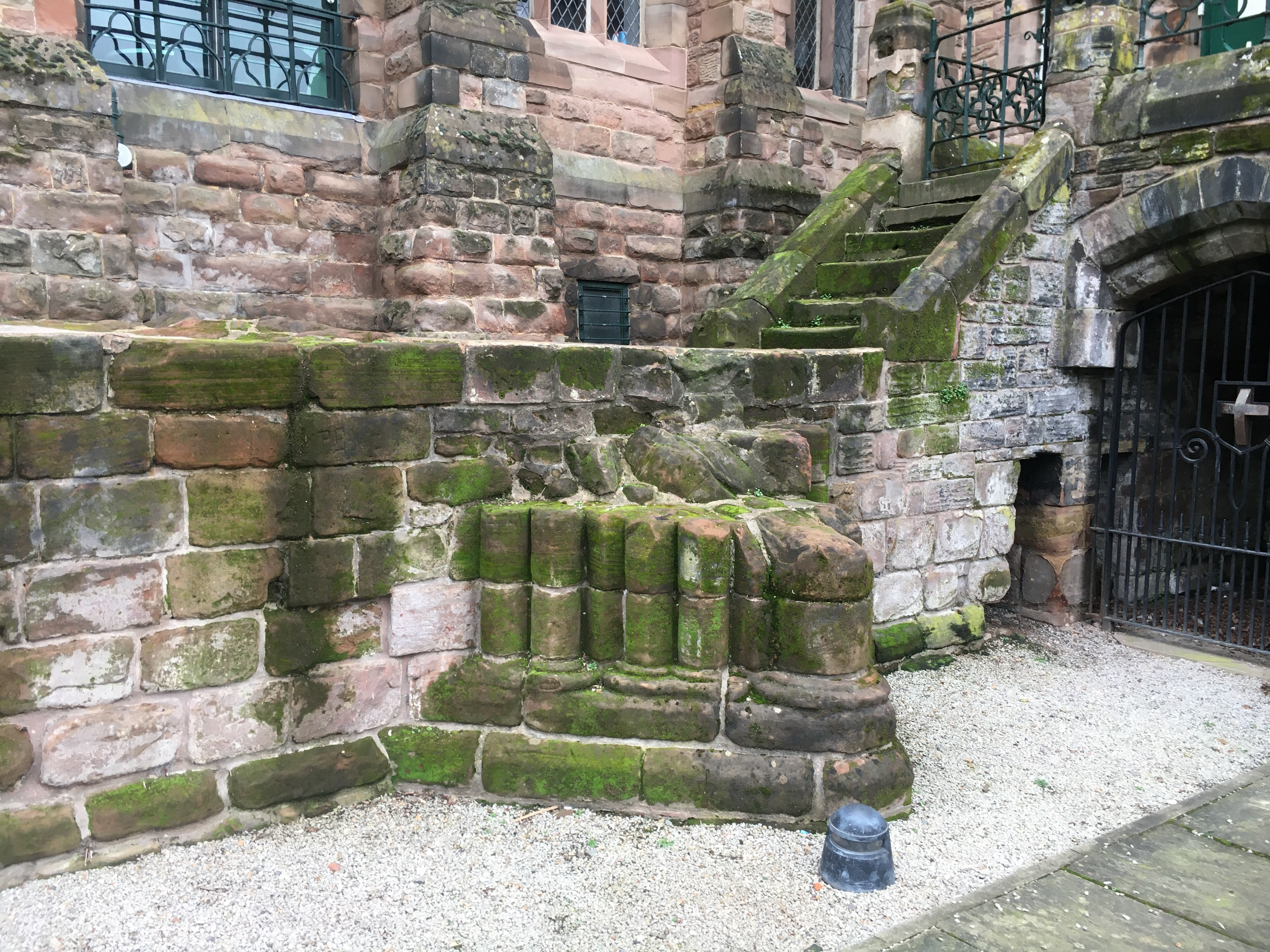
A detail view of the priory remains at the basement level of the building
