= Griff House =

Coordinates: 52.49641°N 1.47366°W

Griff House is the childhood home of George Eliot, on the road to Coventry, south of Nuneaton, where Eliot (as Mary Ann Evans) lived from the age of 1 to 21.

The building, off the Griff Roundabout on the A444 is now the Griff House Beefeater & Nuneaton Premier Travel Inn on Coventry Road, Nuneaton (CV10 7PJ). The Griff Farm buildings, which Mary's father Robert Evans farmed, are now divided by a wall from Griff House. The George Eliot Fellowship in August 2013 made representation to preserve some of the outbuildings.

The house was also once home to the cartographer and Fellow of the Royal Society Henry Beighton best known for his map of Warwickshire (1727/8).
