= Bond's Hospital =

Grade II listed building in Coventry, West Midlands

Coordinates: 52°24′31″N 1°30′51″W

- Bond's and Ford's Hospital Charity
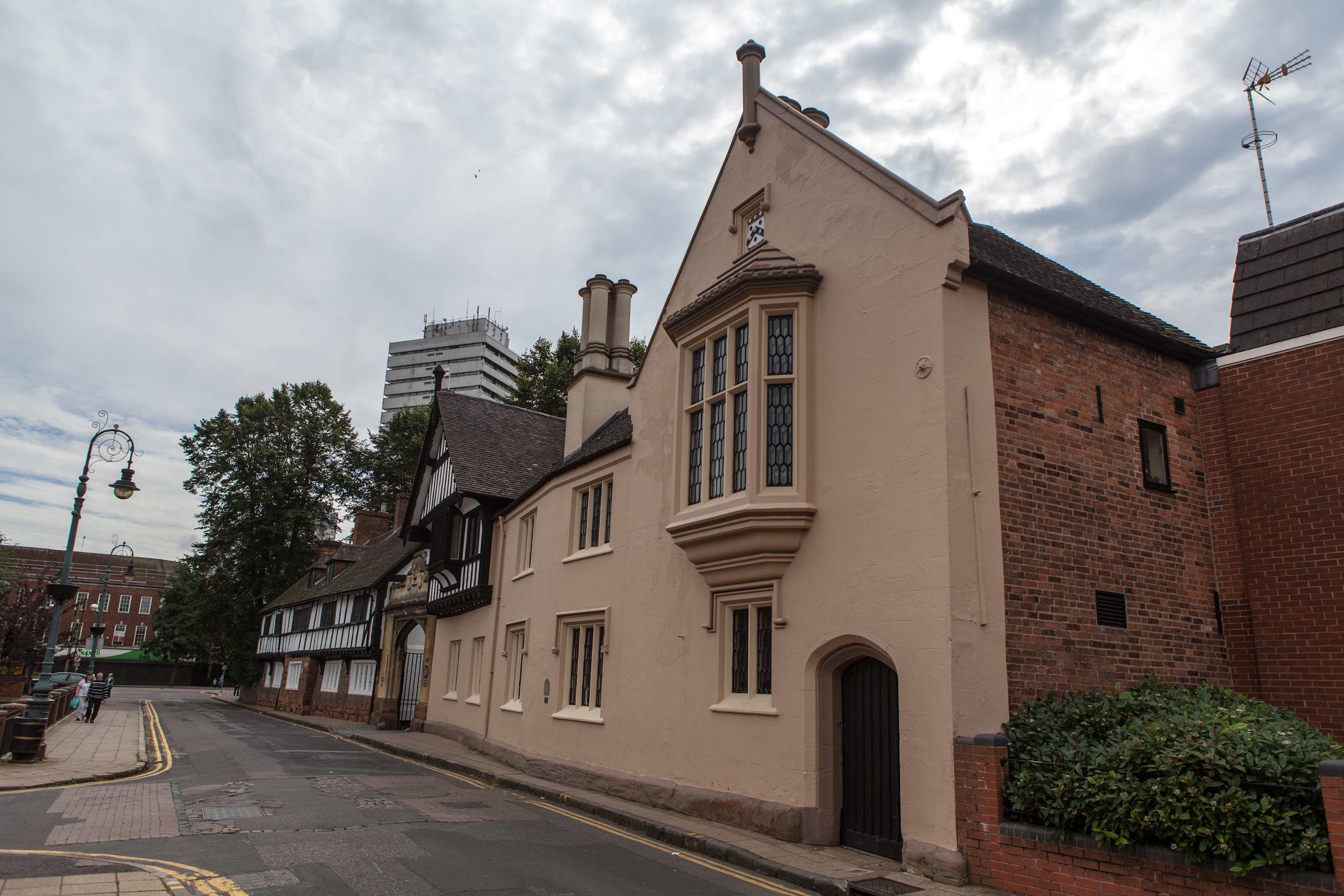
- Hill Street, showing Bond's Hospital and Bablake School (the half-timbered building in the background)

Geography
- Location: Hill Street, Coventry, England, United Kingdom

Services
- Emergency department: No Accident & Emergency
- Beds: 12

History
- Founded: 1506

Links
- Lists: Hospitals in England

Bond's Hospital is an almshouse in Coventry, England, established for old bedesmen. It is a Grade II* listed building.

It was built in 1506 on Hill Street, around the same courtyard as the old disused buildings of Bablake School. Parts have been revised and rebuilt since but it retains many original features. It is still operated as charitable housing.

== History ==
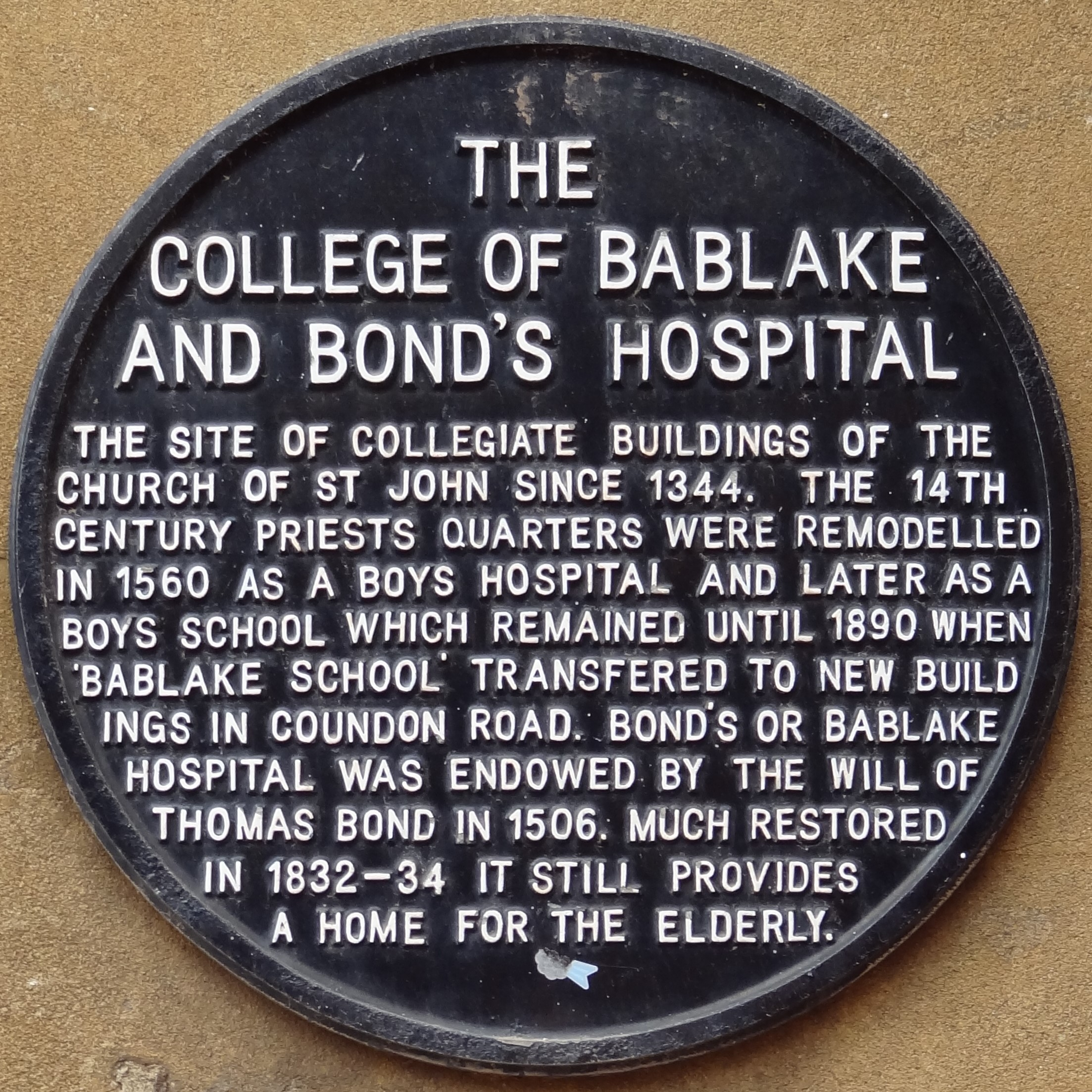
The College of Bablake and Bond's Hospital plaque

Bond's Hospital was founded in 1506 by Thomas Bond, a draper who had become Mayor of Coventry in 1497. The site was next to the 14th century College of Bablake (Old Bablake School). Bond left money in his will for "the sustenance of ten poor men, and of a woman who was to attend to their necessities". They were required to attend church services three times a day and pray for the founder and the Trinity Guild. His son tried to take some of the lands given to the charity and was sued. In 1610, the crown took the land which was bought back by the city.

Although most of the street frontage was rebuilt in 1832, the west end bay rebuilt in 1834, and the back wing extended in 1847, the building essentially still retains all its original features. Four flats were added in the 1970s and 31 two-bedroom flats in 2004. As of 2006, 75 sheltered homes were available.

Bond's Hospital is open to the public on open days.

Ford's Hospital was a similar 16th century foundation for women almoners. The ownership and operation of Bonds Hospital is now vested in the Bond's and Ford's Hospital Charity, part of the Coventry Church Municipal Charities.

== Architecture ==
Bond's Hospital is a timber framed building with brick infilling, and a tiled roof with bargeboards. It consists of twelve bed-sitting rooms and a common room, and the garden at its rear contains a portion of Coventry's old city wall.

== See also ==
- Grade II* listed buildings in Coventry
