= Golden Cross, Coventry =

The Golden Cross
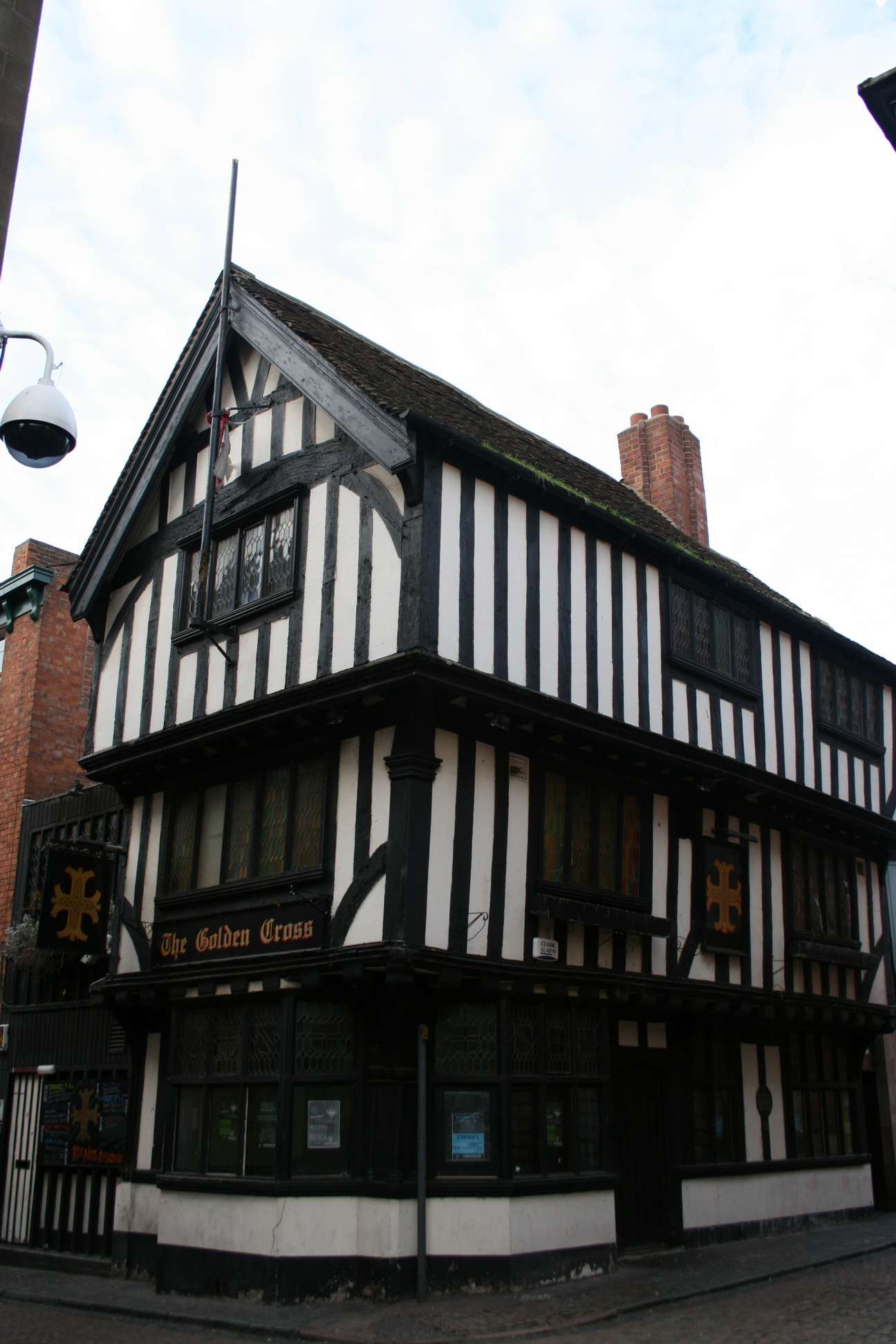
- The Golden Cross pub
- Interactive map of the The Golden Cross area

General information
- Location: 8 Hay Lane, Coventry, West Midlands, CV1 5RF
- Coordinates: 52°24′28″N 1°30′31″W
- Opened: 1583

The Golden Cross is one of the oldest pubs in Coventry, West Midlands, and one of the longest-established alcohol-serving venues in England.

== History of the building ==
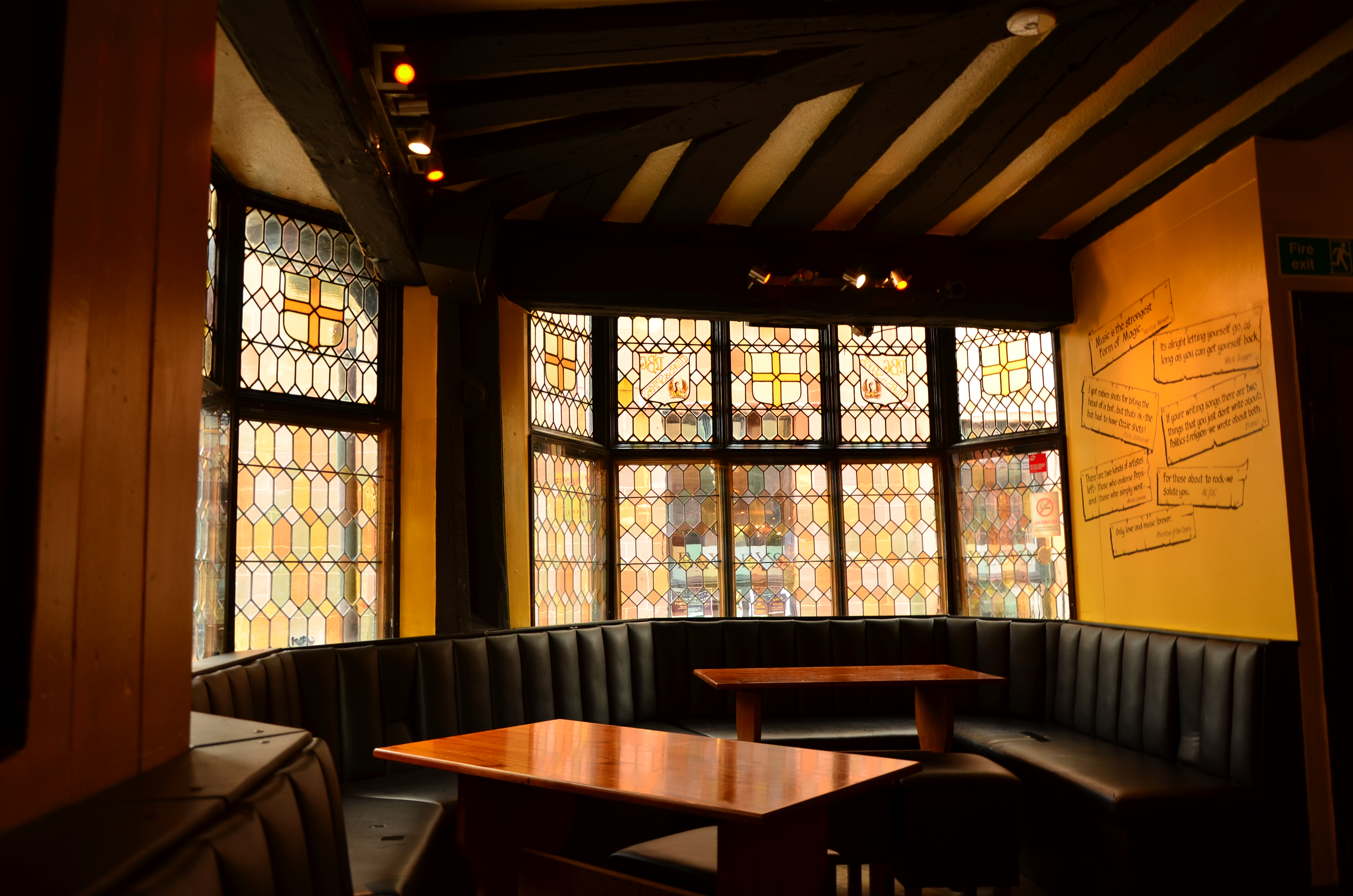
The interior of the pub

First mentioned as an inn in 1661, the Golden Cross is dated to 1583. The structure of the building is typical of the Tudor-style of this period with three vaulted or ‘jettied’ upper floors. It has close-studding on the upper floors and moulded jetty boards. The finest feature is the 'dragon beam' visible in the ground-floor ceiling. This is a large timber beam that enables a jettied first floor to pass round a corner of the building.

Today, the Golden Cross stands much modified. A restoration in the late nineteenth and early twentieth centuries used timbers from the original wooden bell tower of St. Michael's Church. An extension in 1968 substantially changed the interior of the pub, doubling the building's size by extending the gentleman's bar, smoke room and upstairs club room.

In February 1955, the Golden Cross was listed by the now-disbanded Coventry City Guild (1914–1961) as a Grade II* listed building of special interest. There are only three buildings like it in the city centre.

After suppression of religious houses, inns such as the Golden Cross became important meeting places for city companies. Groups such as the Golden Cross Philanthropic Society, formed in 1859, held regular meetings in the club room upstairs. The society was composed of well-respected men of society and their aim was to help the poor by raising money for local hospitals, schools etc. The Coventry City Supporters club also held a meeting at the Golden Cross in 1951. The poet Philip Larkin was a frequent visitor. Since the 1970s, the club room has been associated with live music.

The pub stands in the medieval heart of the city close to several other ancient buildings that survived the bombing raids of the Second World War, namely the shell of the old Coventry Cathedral of St. Michael, St. Mary's Guild Hall, Holy Trinity Church.

== Coventry Cross ==
The public house is probably named after the nearby Coventry Cross. The new monument is 100 metres from the original position in Broadgate and Cross-Cheaping. In 1422 a cross was set up at the south end of Cross Cheaping; it may not have been the first on the site. This was replaced in 1543 by a magnificent monument, for which Sir William Holles had left £200 in his will.

This Coventry Cross was erected some 40 years before the Golden Cross public house. In 1668–9 it was refurbished, painted in bright colours and smothered in gold leaf, to the point that it was painful to look at on a sunny day. It had a hexagonal base and was 57 feet high, with niches containing statues of saints and kings. It fell into decay and was demolished in 1771.

== A timeline of the Golden Cross ==
- 1583 – built in typical Tudor style
- 1661 – reported as one of 137 inns/alehouses in Coventry
- 1900s – underwent extensive restoration and reconstruction
- 1955 – registered as a Grade II listed building of particular interest
- 1968 – substantially extended
- 2016 - completely refurbished by Heineken.

== See also ==
- Grade II* listed buildings in Coventry
