= Stoke St Michael's Church, Coventry =

- Stoke St Michael's
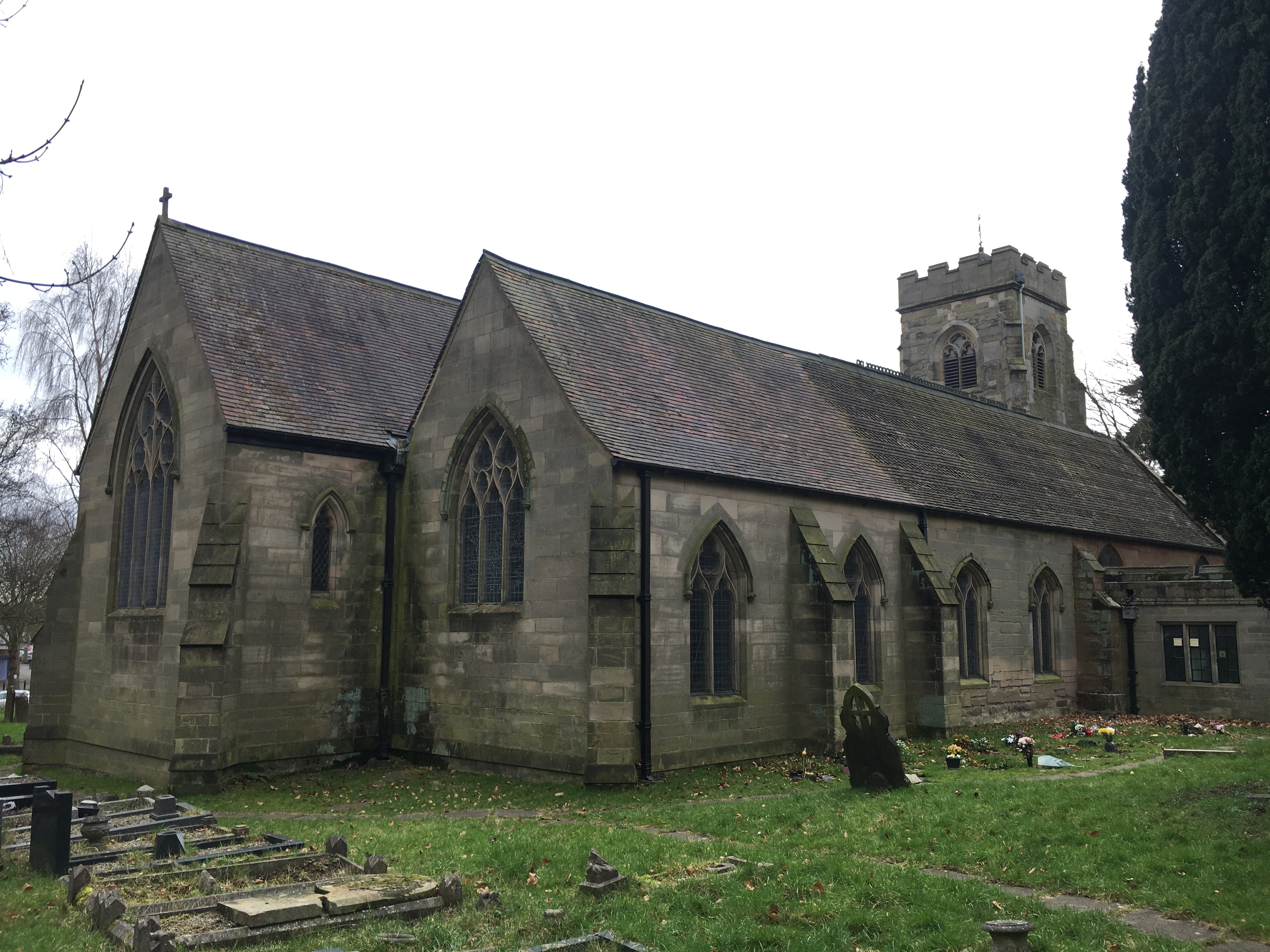
- A view of Stoke St Michael's from the north-east
- Stoke St Michael's Church, Coventry
- 52.4120°N 1.4749°W
- OS grid reference: SP 35808 79459
- Location: Walsgrave Road, Stoke, Coventry CV2 4BG
- Country: England
- Denomination: Church of England
- Churchmanship: Central

History
- Status: Active
- Dedication: St Michael

Architecture
- Functional status: Parish church
- Heritage designation: Grade II* listed
- Designated: 5 February 1955

Administration
- Diocese: Coventry
- Archdeaconry: Coventry
- Parish: Stoke

Clergy
- Rector: The Rev’d Canon Claire McArthur Christopher Dronfield Sue Morris James Mckay

Stoke St Michael's is the Church of England parish church of Stoke, Coventry which continues to serve as a place of worship in the community since its foundation in the 12th century by the Earl of Chester. The church is situated on the Walsgrave Road (A4600) east of Coventry city centre.

== History ==
The foundation of the church is said to date to 1100 when Hugh d'Avranches, the first Earl of Chester, built a church on the site. In the reign of King Stephen the fourth Earl of Chester, Ranulph, handed this original Stoke St Michaels over to the Priory of St Mary which sent out priests to take services there. Nothing of this original building remains. The oldest parts of the church today are the west bays of the nave and the tower, which date back to the 14th century. This 14th century church consisted of a tower, a short nave and south aisle and a chancel projecting to the east. In the 19th century the church was extended to support a larger population in the parish, first by the addition of a north aisle and a gallery, then in 1861 by a major rebuilding. This consisted of doubling the length of the nave and aisles, and constructing a new chancel. Further building works and modernisation took place through the 20th and 21st centuries. The church was Grade II* listed in 1955.

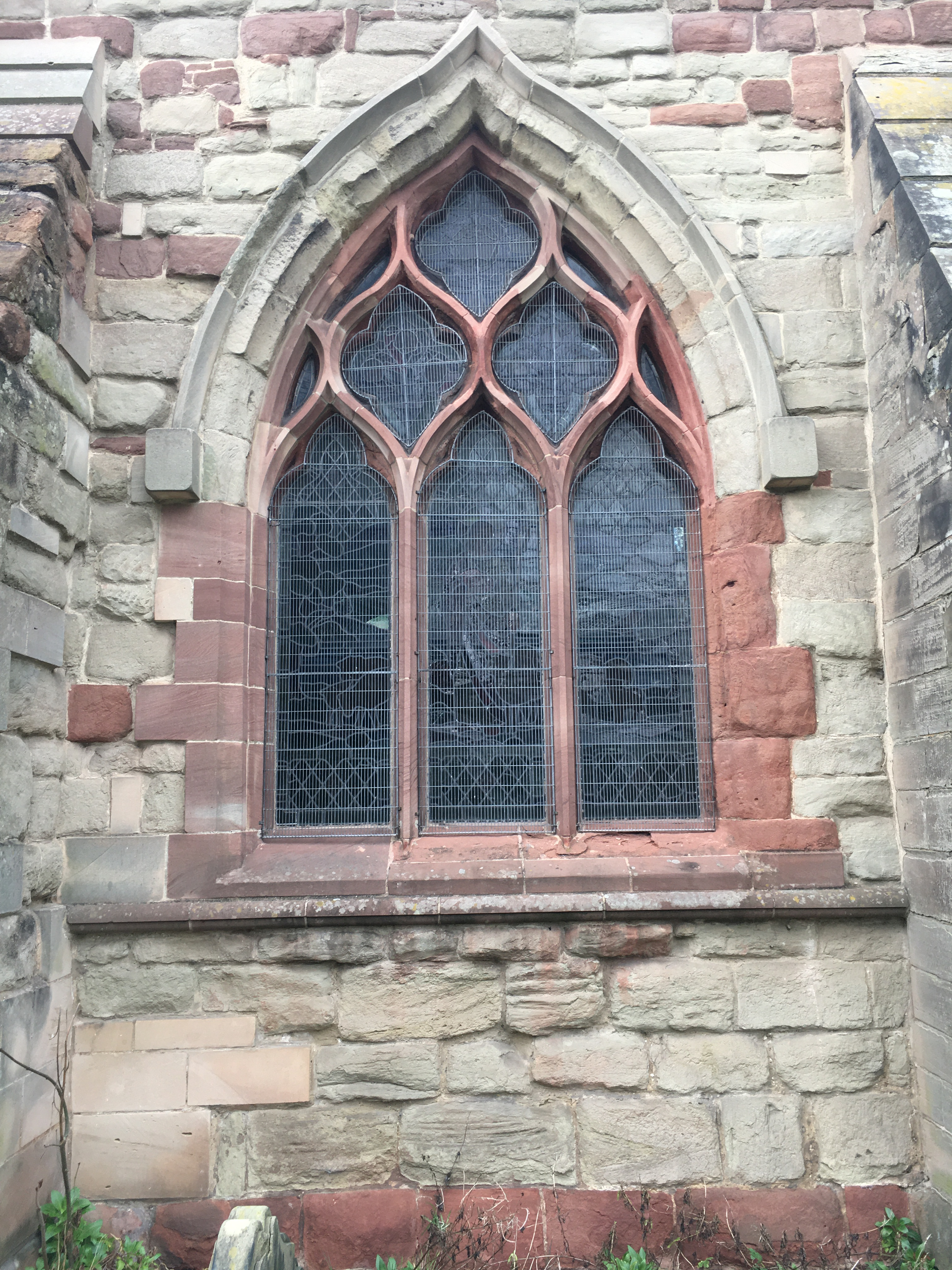
A window built in the 15th century with 19th century repairs and additions

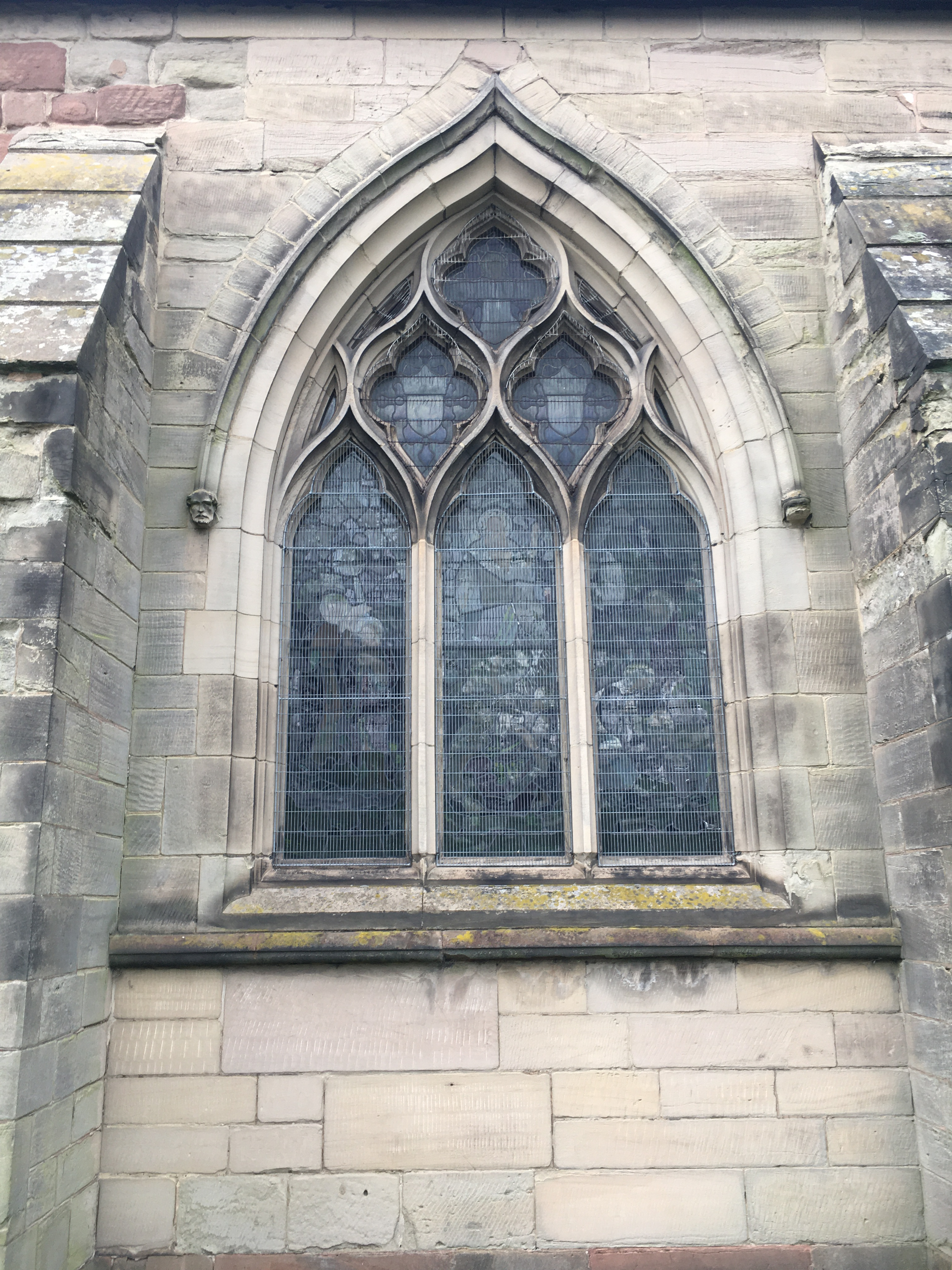
A window built in the 19th century extension, in the style of the original windows

== Bells ==
The tower originally held a ring of three bells, but this was replaced by a ring of five in 1902 which was gradually augmented until reaching a full ring of eight in 1905. The first peal on the eight was rung on 21 February 1908 for the wedding of Joshua Perkins, who donated the bells to the church.
