= Simister (surname) =

Simister is a surname. Notable people with the surname include:

- Ben Simister (born 1988), Ice hockey player
- Henry Walter Simister (1881–1958), British architect
- Meaghan Simister (born 1986), Canadian luger
- Scott Simister (born 1973), Australian rules footballer
