= Marie Bethell Beauclerc =

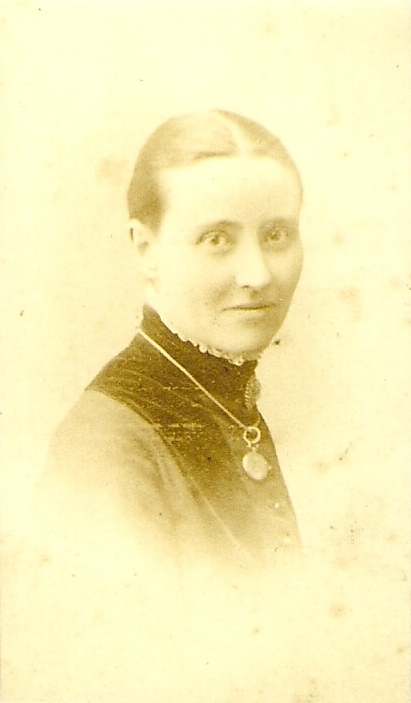
- Born: Maria Bethell; 10 October 1845; St Pancras, London, England
- Died: 19 September 1897 (aged 51); Birmingham, England
- Resting place: Key Hill Cemetery
- Known for: First woman reporter in England; First shorthand teacher in Birmingham; First woman teacher in an English boys' public school (Rugby); Officially introduced typewriting to Birmingham

Marie Bethell Beauclerc (10 October 1845 – 19 September 1897) was a pioneer in the teaching of Pitman's shorthand and typing in Birmingham, England. In 1888 she was the first woman to be appointed as a teacher in an English boys' public school, at Rugby School. The Phonetic Journal, September 1891 and the journal, Birmingham Faces And Places, September 1892, both credit her with being the first female reporter in England.

== Early life ==
Marie Bethell Beauclerc was born in London in 1845 as Maria Bethell. When she was around four years old, she and her older twin siblings Richard and Elizabeth, were sent from London to a boarding school near Bath. By this time Maria Bethell's surname and the surname of her siblings, had been changed to Beauclerc. The children's father, Richard Bethell, died when Maria was five years old. The reason for the name change of Maria, Richard and Elizabeth from Bethell to Beauclerc, however, is unknown. Maria Beauclerc attended Weston Boarding Schools near Bath until circumstances forced her to leave School at the age of nine. When aged twelve, she began teaching herself shorthand from a manual which she found in some waste paper. The manual entitled The Phonographic Teacher, was written by Isaac Pitman (knighted in 1894). On her thirteenth birthday, Maria Beauclerc and her mother moved to Birmingham where she continued her studies through a member of the Phonetic Society in Bath who corrected her exercises through the post. The addition of Bethell to the name Beauclerc appeared for the first time in the title of a biography entitled Marie Bethell Beauclerc in The Phonetic Journal Sept. 1891.

== Reporter ==
In 1863, at the age of eighteen, Maria Beauclerc was engaged for two months as shorthand amanuensis to a phrenological lecturer visiting Birmingham. Later George Dawson (1821–1876), editor of the Birmingham Morning News between 1871 and 1873, also engaged Maria Beauclerc because of her outstanding shorthand reporting skills. The appointment of a female reporter by the Birmingham Morning News was extraordinary as it was the first time in England that a female had been engaged by a newspaper as a shorthand reporter. Maria Beauclerc became professionally known as Marie Beauclerc and her work at the Birmingham Morning News included the reporting of many public meetings, conferences and lectures. At this time, shorthand was still a male dominated expertise however from approximately 1865 until Dawson's sudden death in 1876, Marie Beauclerc also recorded most of the content of the nine volumes of Dawson's lectures, prayers and sermons. Four volumes were published after Dawson's death. George St. Clair, the editor of these volumes, acknowledges in the prefaces that "The discourses are mostly from the shorthand reports of Miss Marie Beauclerc." A similar preface reads, "When a lecture is reported by Miss Beauclerc – as is the case with the one on the Shadow of Death – we have a near approach to fulness and accuracy". Further on St. Clair adds, "I have had, as before, the invaluable help of Miss Beauclerc in collating and transcribing." Marie Beauclerc is also credited in prefaces of volumes of work by author and preacher Christopher J. Street (1855–1931). When Unitarian clergyman and lecturer, Robert Collyer (1823–1912), visited Birmingham from the United States, he engaged Marie Beauclerc to report and edit his sermons and prayers which were delivered at Newhall Hill Church Birmingham on 2 September, 1883 and published during the same year.

== Teacher ==
In 1874 the Perry Barr Institute, the first suburban institute in Birmingham was established and Marie Beauclerc was appointed a teacher of phonography. She held her position at this institute for fourteen years until 1888. Marie Beauclerc was also engaged in teaching phonography when it was introduced at the Birmingham and Midland Institute in 1876. "Thousands of pupils have passed through the hands of Miss Beauclerc, in connection with this institute alone; and many young men owe their start in life to the knowledge they have thus gained". "In 1888, Miss Beauclerc was accorded the high honour of the appointment of Teacher of Shorthand at Rugby School". This was the first time shorthand had been taught in an English public school and the first appointment of a female teacher in an English boys' public school. There were one hundred boys in her classes and Dr. Percival, headmaster at this time "expressed his satisfaction at the excellence of the teaching and the progress made by the pupils". Beauclerc also taught senior boys at the Birmingham Blue Coat School and in addition to achieving as a female teacher of predominately male students in the fields of shorthand and typing, Beauclerc was a teacher of dancing and callisthenics.

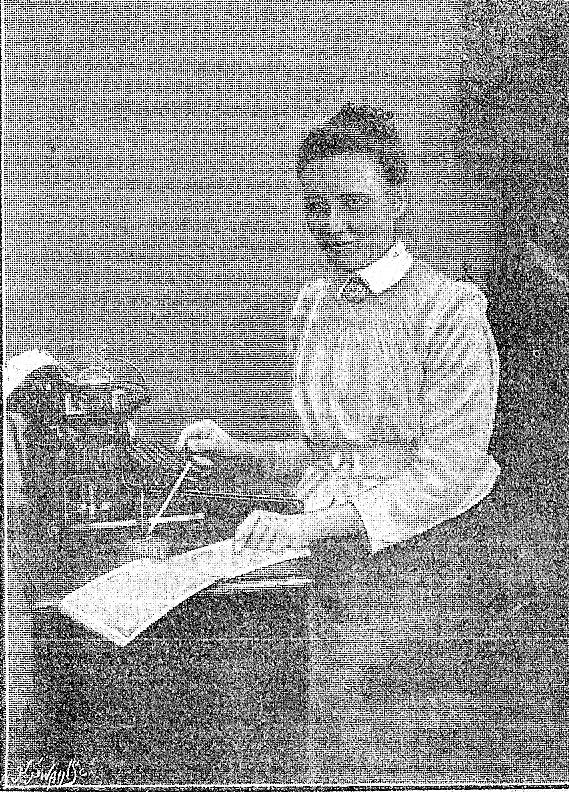
Marie Bethell Beauclerc Phonetic Journal Sept. 1891

== Pioneer ==
In 1887, Marie Beauclerc established a Shorthand Writers Association and "officially introduced the art of typewriting to Birmingham". Also in 1887, Beauclerc delivered a paper at the International Shorthand Congress and Phonographic Jubilee in London. Her paper, entitled Phonography in Birmingham, illustrates her passion for her pioneering work and is contained in the printed Transactions of the Congress held by the Pitman Library at the University of Bath. In England at this time, shorthand and typing were still male domains with few places available for female students and few employment opportunities for females. Marie Beauclerc's pioneering work in the fields of shorthand and typing, benefited the progress of Birmingham's business and cultural community, while her example and the discussion she generated, (e.g. International Congress) helped pave the way for the explosion of female stenography in the 20th century. In 1892, Beauclerc now known as Marie Bethell Beauclerc, retired from teaching at the Birmingham and Midland Institute. Her retirement was due to illness, however, she continued to edit Sunday Evening Lectures by James C. Street "during her short intervals of ease".

== Death ==
Marie Bethell Beauclerc died on 19 September, 1897. She is buried at Key Hill Cemetery, Birmingham, two plots away from George Dawson. A quote from her headstone reads:

This stone was erected by the members of the Church of the Saviour, Birmingham. In grateful recognition of her services, by which many of the prayers, sermons and lectures of the late George Dawson, MA have been preserved.

== Commemoration ==
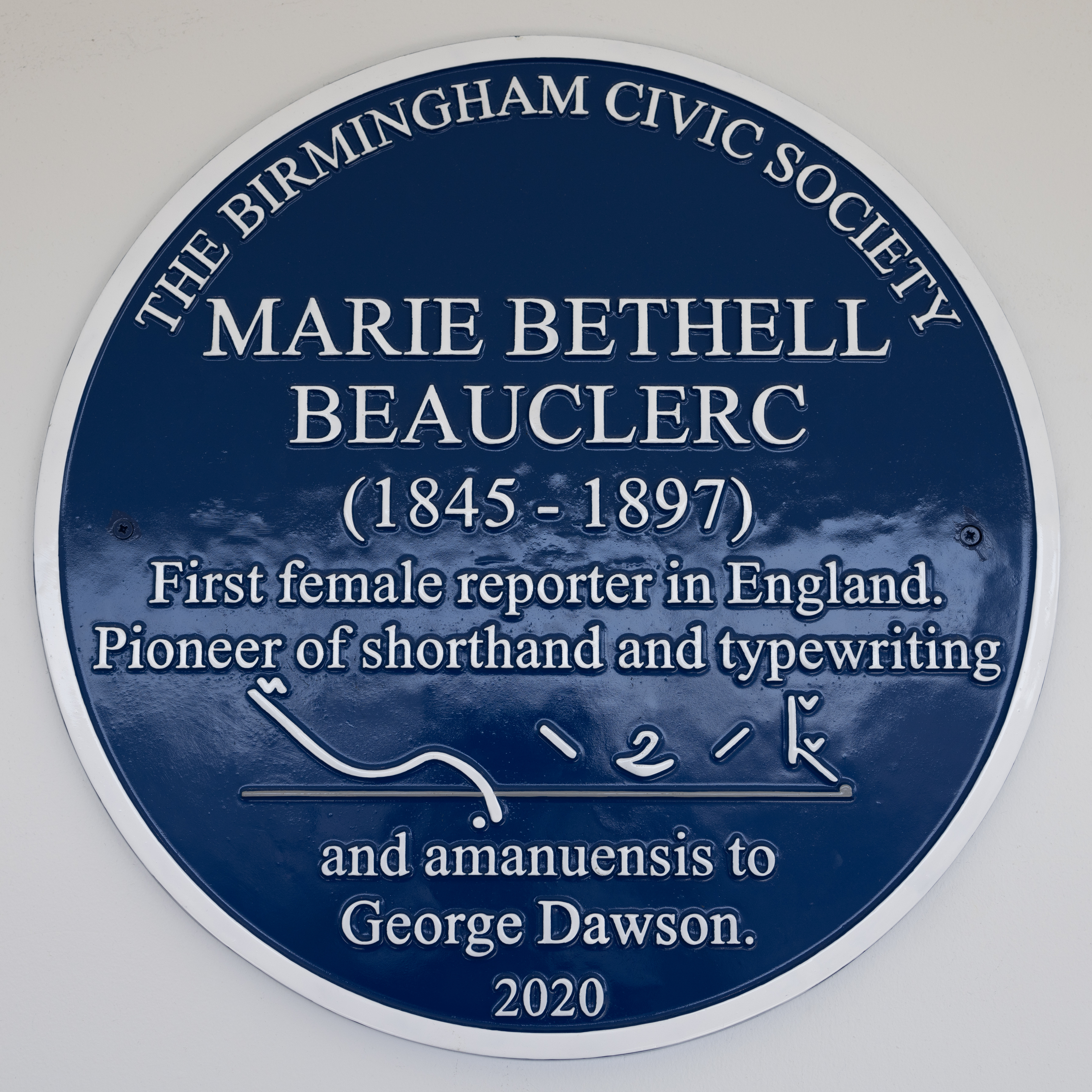
Plaque at Library of Birmingham

A Birmingham Civic Society blue plaque in commemoration of Beauclerc's achievements in Birmingham was unveiled in the Library of Birmingham on 9 October, 2020.
