= St Mary's Guildhall =

Historic building in Coventry, England

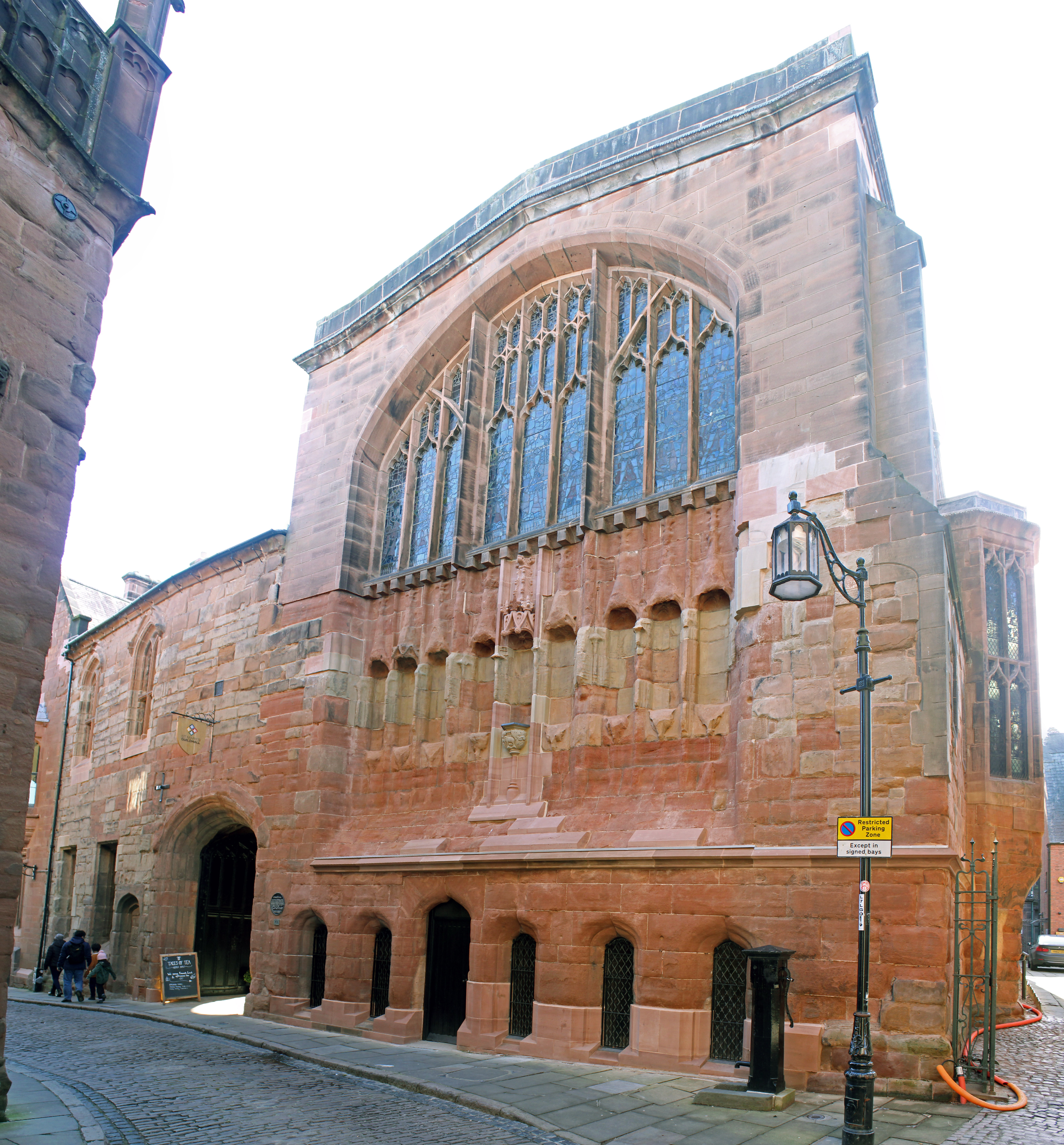
- The entrance to St Mary's Hall in Bayley Lane, Coventry.

- Location within West Midlands county
- 52.4077°N 1.5078°W
- Location: Coventry, West Midlands

History
- Built: 1342

Listed Building – Grade I
- Designated: 5 February 1955
- Reference no.: 1116402

St Mary's Hall is a municipal building in Bayley Lane in Coventry, West Midlands, England. It is a Grade I listed building.

== History ==
The building was built in the medieval style between 1340 and 1342 and much altered and extended in 1460.

The guildhall originally served as the headquarters of the merchant guild of St Mary, and subsequently of the united guilds of the Holy Trinity, St Mary, St John the Baptist and St Katherine, which merged in 1392.

Following the suppression of the chantries and religious guilds under King Edward VI in 1547, for a time it served as the city's armoury and as its treasury (until 1822), as well as the headquarters for administration for the city council (until the Council House opened in 1920).

In November 1569, following the Catholic Rising of the North, Mary, Queen of Scots was rushed south from Tutbury Castle to Coventry. Elizabeth I sent a letter, instructing the people of Coventry to look after Mary. She suggested that Mary be held somewhere secure, such as Coventry Castle. However, by that time the castle was too decayed and Mary was instead first held at the Bull Inn, Smithford Street before being moved to the Mayoress's Parlour in St Mary's Guildhall. Following the defeat of the rebels, Mary was once more sent north to Chatsworth in May 1570.

On 3 April 1604 Princess Elizabeth Stuart and her ladies rode from Coombe Abbey to Coventry. She heard a sermon in St Michael's Church and dined in St Mary's Hall. Prince Henry Stuart rode to Coventry from Leicester on 20 August 1612 and had supper in St Mary's Hall. He stayed at a house in Little Park street. Later in the 1600s, the Guildhall was used as armoury during the English Civil War.

In the 1750s, the medieval flooring was replaced with a sprung wooden floor for dancing.

In January 1847, formerly enslaved person and famous American abolitionist Frederick Douglass gave a lecture at St. Mary's Guildhall during his speaking tour of Great Britain and Ireland. The crowd of a ‘sea of upturned faces' was noted by Douglass, who said that this 'filled him with hope that the day was not far distant when there would be not a slave in all the world’. The Frederick Douglass in Coventry Project was launched in 2020 by staff and students of Coventry University to promote the city's civil rights heritage.

In the 1861 the Guildhall operated as a soup kitchen.

== Restoration ==
George Eld, mayor of Coventry (1834–5) was an antiquarian who encouraged appreciation of Coventry's ancient buildings. He initiated the restoration of the fourteenth-century interior of the Mayoress' parlour.

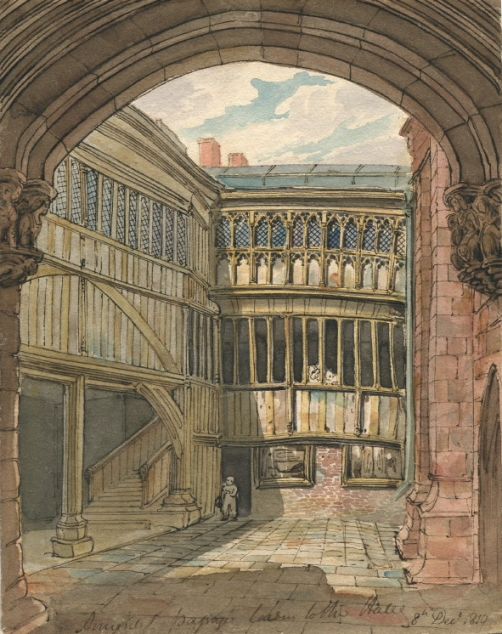
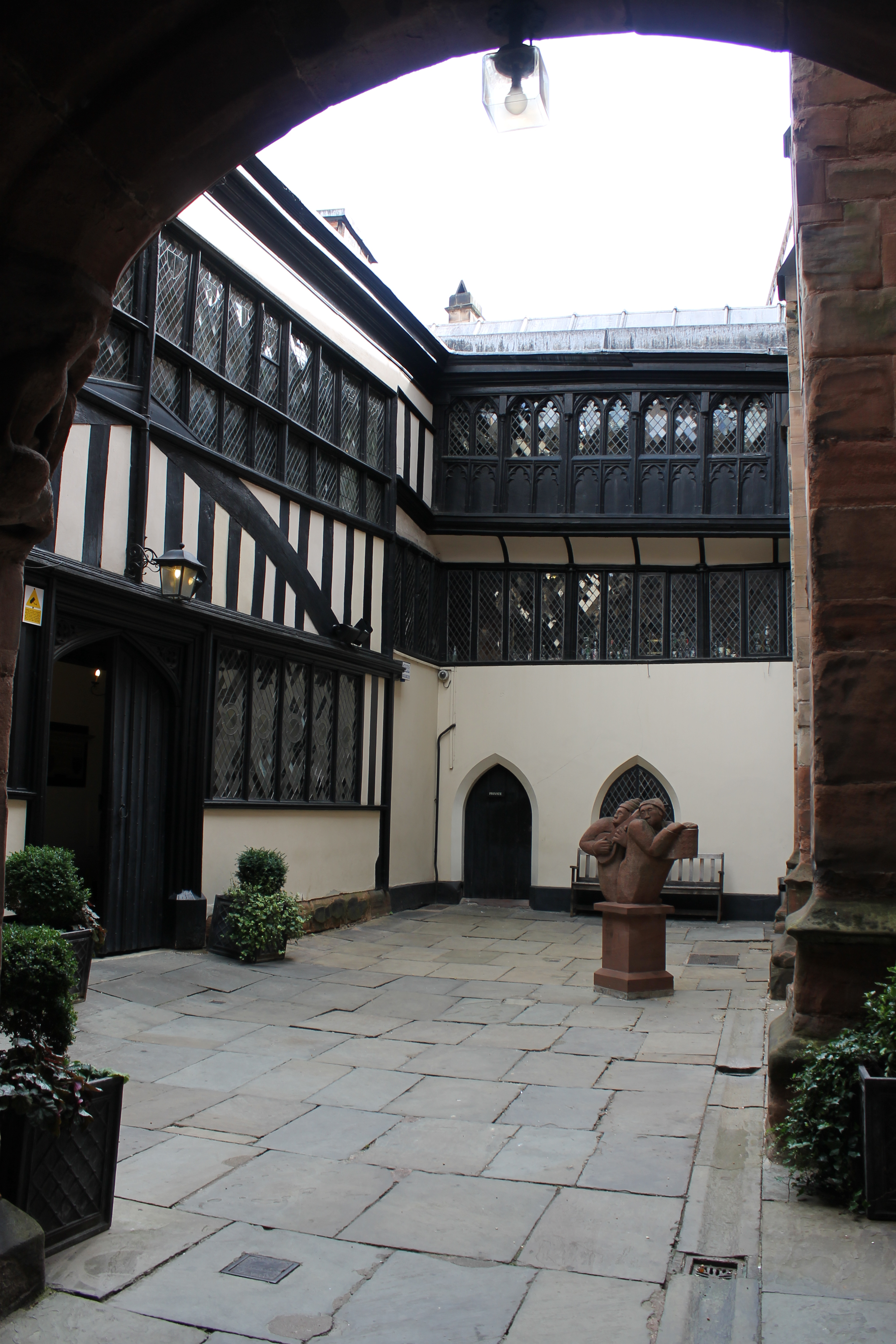
The archway entrance in 1810 and in 2012

The stained-glass window in the north of the Great Hall was restored in 1893 and a Muniment Room was added in 1894.

Restoration work by the council received the approval of the committee of the Coventry City Guild in 1930. Improvements had included the repair of the door at the north entrance to the crypt and providing glass and grilles in the windows of the fore crypt. Outside the crumbling exterior stonework was stabilized.

Further restoration work began in 2020, with £5.6m from a council Cultural Capital Investment Programme spent on the project. The work was completed in July 2022. It includes a lift to provide wheelchair access to the first floor, 360 degrees panoramic views of all the rooms on digital tour tablets and a medieval kitchen that was revealed to visitors for the first time in over a century.

The building also has a vaulted undercroft which is used as a tea room called Tales of Tea.

== Artworks ==
The building retains a collection of royal portraits from the seventeenth to nineteenth centuries, arms and armour and fine stained glass. A marble statue of Lady Godiva by William Calder Marshall is housed in an oriel with fragmented stained-glass windows off the Great hall.

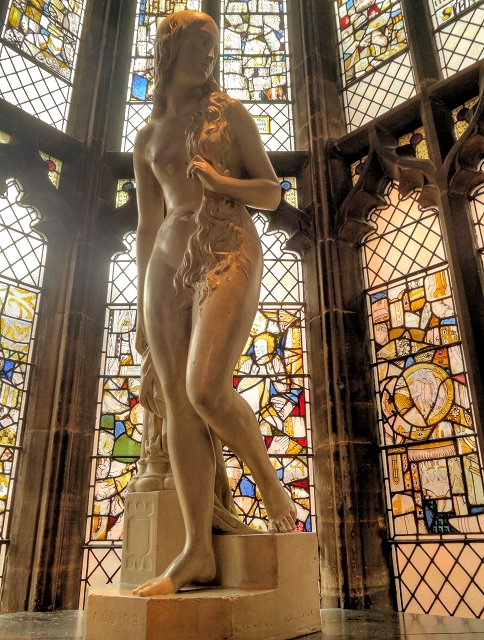
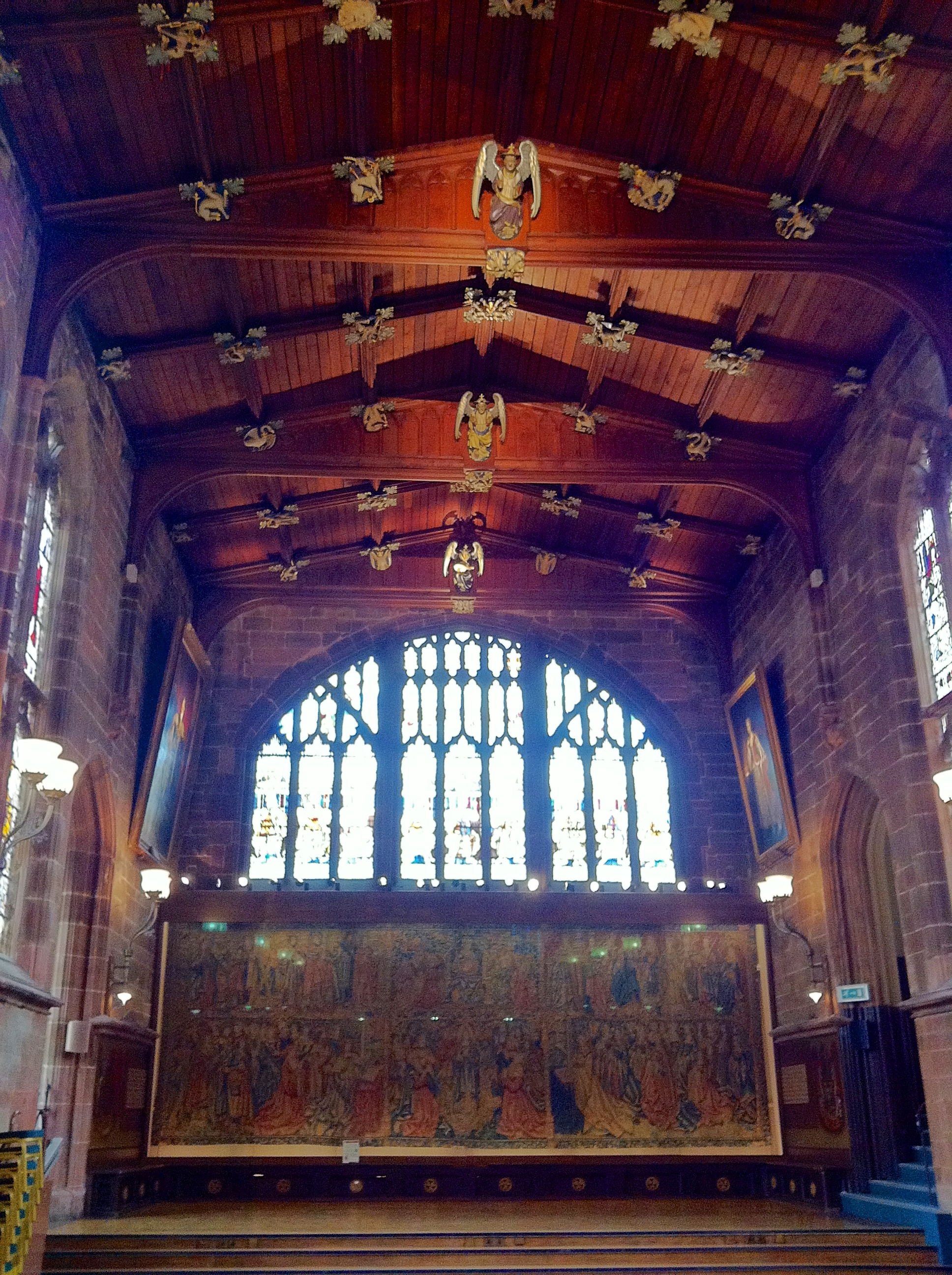

Paintings include a portrait by John Shackleton of King George I and a portrait by Godfrey Kneller of Queen Caroline of Ansbach. In 1861, the artist David Gee painted The Godiva Procession Leaving St Mary's Hall, which is on display nearby in the Herbert Art Gallery and Museum, Coventry.

The guildhall also houses one of the country's most important and unique medieval tapestries, the Coventry Tapestry, which was created for the Guildhall somewhere between 1505 and 1515. The couple portrayed in the tapestry are thought to be King Henry VI and Queen Margaret of Anjou, alongside other noble figures including Henry Beaufort, Bishop of Winchester, John Talbot, 1st Earl of Shrewsbury and Lady Buckingham. The tapestry and the stained glass window above it are considered one of the last shrines to the posthumous cult of Henry VI in England, which rivalled even the cult of the martyr Thomas Becket.

During Coventry's year as European City of Culture in 2019 a conference was held about the legacy and significant of the tapestry. The St Mary’s Hall Coventry Tapestry: Weaving the Threads Together book will be launched in September 2024, featuring proceedings from the conference and new images.

== See also ==
- Guild
- Guildhall
