= Council House, Coventry =

Municipal building in Coventry, West Midlands, England

- The Council House
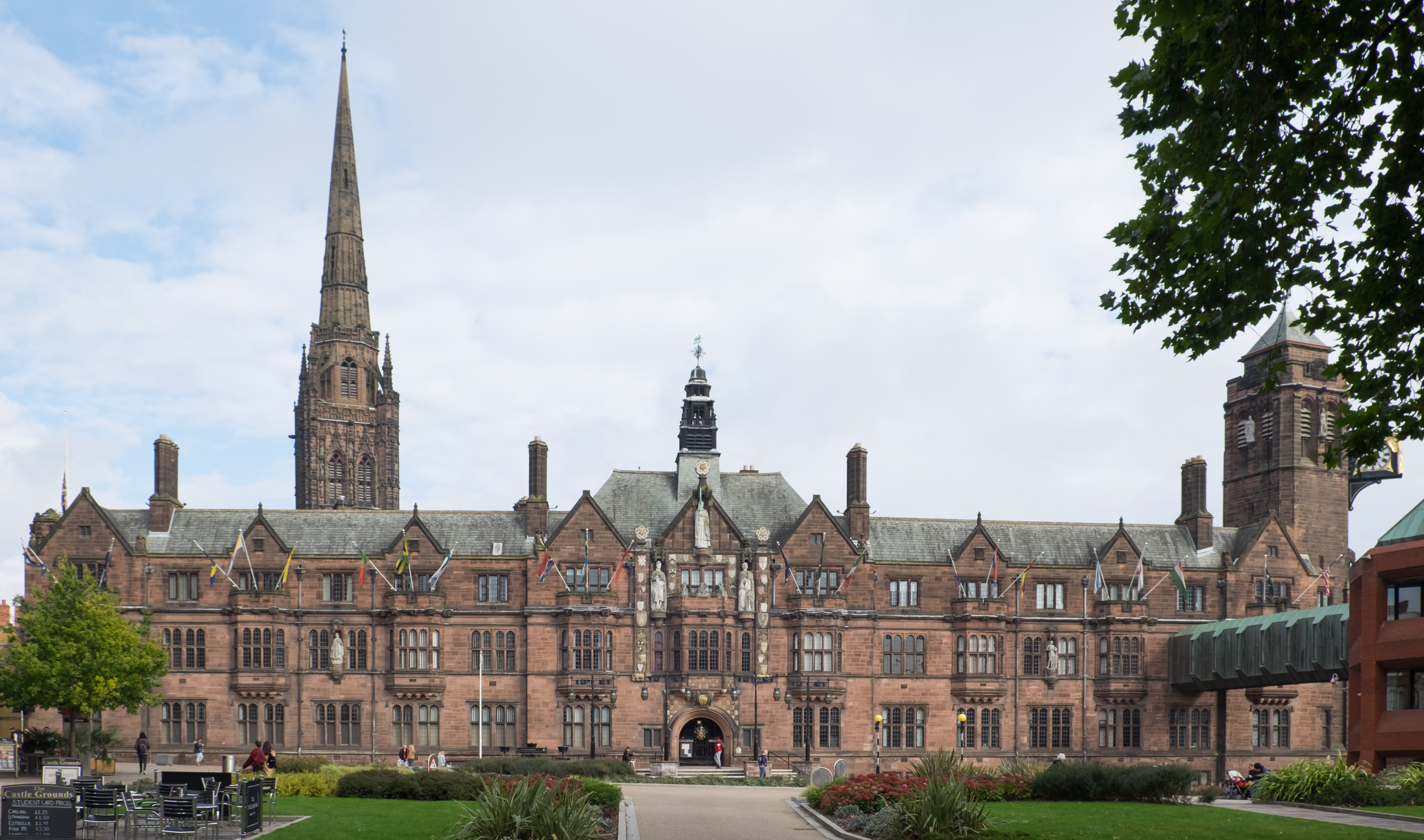
- Council House in its setting at Council House Square
- Interactive map of the Council House, Coventry area

General information
- Architectural style: Tudor Revival
- Classification

Listed Building – Grade II
- Designated: 24 June 1974
- Reference no.: 1342927
- Location: Earl Street, Coventry, United Kingdom
- Coordinates: 52.4072°N 1.5079°W
- Construction started: 1913
- Completed: 1917
- Opened: 11 June 1920
- Owner: Coventry City Council

Technical details
- Floor count: 4

Design and construction
- Architects: Edward Garrett, Henry Walter Simister

Website
- www.coventry.gov.uk/directory_record/66/the_council_house

The Council House, Coventry in Coventry, England, is a Tudor Revival style city hall building which is the home of Coventry City Council and the seat of local government. It was built in the early 20th century. It is a Grade II-listed building.

== History ==
The Council House was commissioned to replace St Mary's Guildhall as the headquarters of the mayor and city corporation. The site on Earl Street had previously been occupied by a row of shops. A design for new municipal offices on the site was approved in 1895, but a dispute then arose as to whether shops should be incorporated into the ground floor of the new buildings; this was not swiftly resolved and, though the site was cleared, it remained vacant for over a decade.

It was finally resolved to proceed without shops; the competitive process for a new design was announced in 1910 and won by architects Edward Garrett and Henry Walter Simister of Birmingham. The brief had been for designs to be submitted for both municipal offices and a town hall, to be envisioned 'as a single scheme' but with the caveat that the town hall might not (or not immediately) be built, as indeed turned out to be the case.

The new Council House was designed in the Elizabethan style, as stipulated by the Borough Corporation, to be in keeping with the old St Mary's Guildhall to the rear. The foundation stone was laid on 12 June 1913 and the building was completed in 1917, although, because of the First World War, the official opening by the Duke of York only took place on 11 June 1920.

It was mainly an office building, designed to accommodate 1,500 people working across the various different municipal departments (ranging from the Town Clerk and City Treasurer to medical, police, education and waterworks officials); but it also contained large formal rooms such as the Council Chamber, Mayor's Parlour and various committee rooms, many of which were decorated with carvings representing the Forest of Arden. The exterior was clad in Runcorn stone and roofed with Cotswold stone. A large clock tower was built, topped by a figure of St Michael; the clock was built by J. Smith & Sons of Derby, working to Simister's ornamental design (dated 1914, is a timepiece: although there is a capacious belfry there are no bells).

Statues designed by Henry Wilson depicting Leofric (who founded monasteries in Coventry), Godiva (who was patron of the local monasteries) and Justice were installed above the entrance in 1924.

During the Second World War, the bombings on the night of 14 November 1940, known as the Coventry Blitz, gave rise to some damage to the building including the destruction of the stained glass windows. The former Duke of York returned to the Council House as King George VI to survey the damage in the aftermath of the raid.

In September 2017, the council moved some 1,500 staff to its new 13-storey tower block at One Friargate. They had previously been housed in a large Civic Centre complex, dating in part from the 1950s, which had faced the east wing of the Council House, and which had latterly been linked to it by a metal walkway over Earl Street (dating from the 1970s). The former Civic Centre was largely demolished after the council had moved out.

== Gallery ==
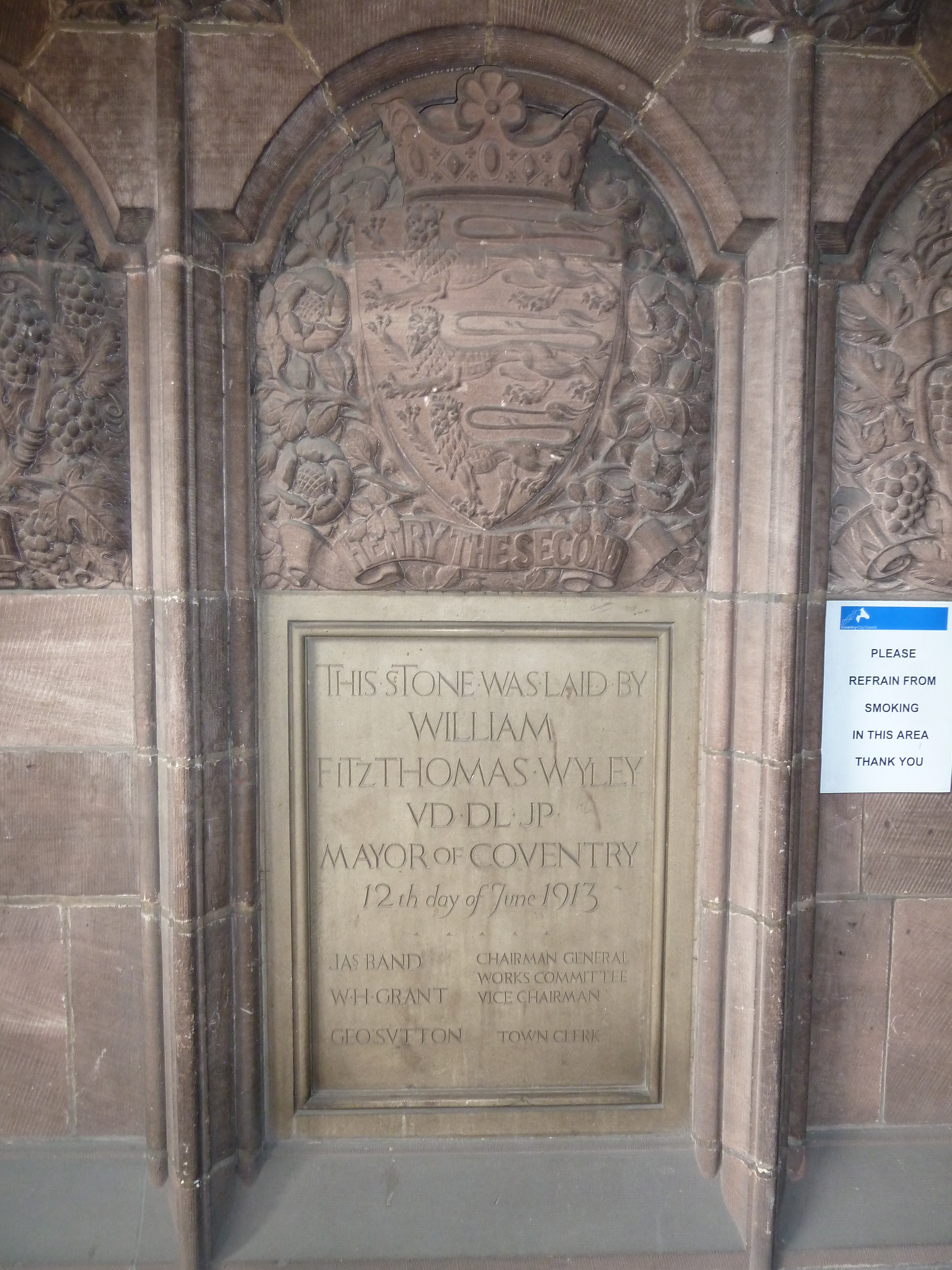
The foundation stone dated 12 June 1913.

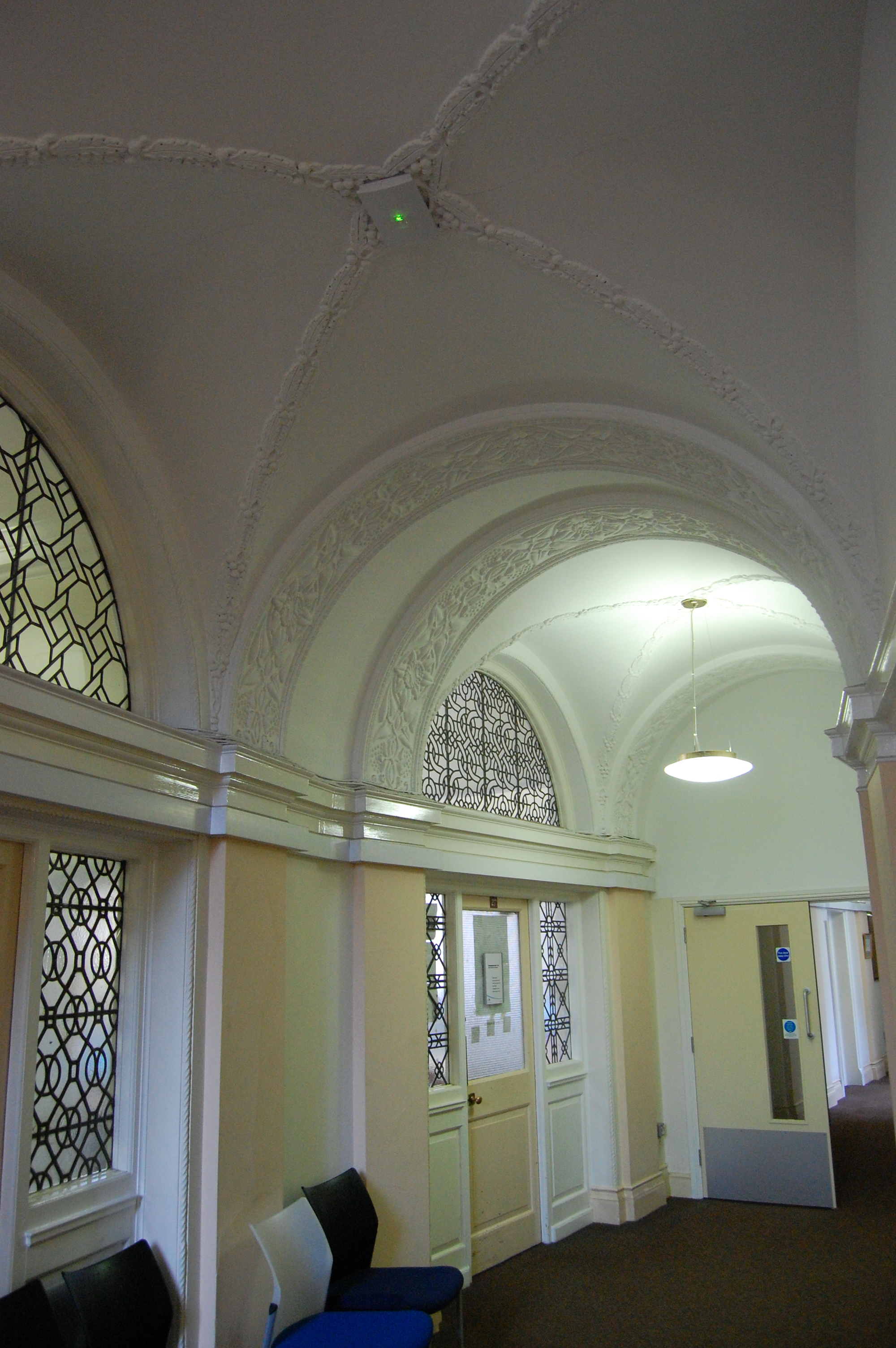
The interior corridors have decorative plasterwork and leaded windows

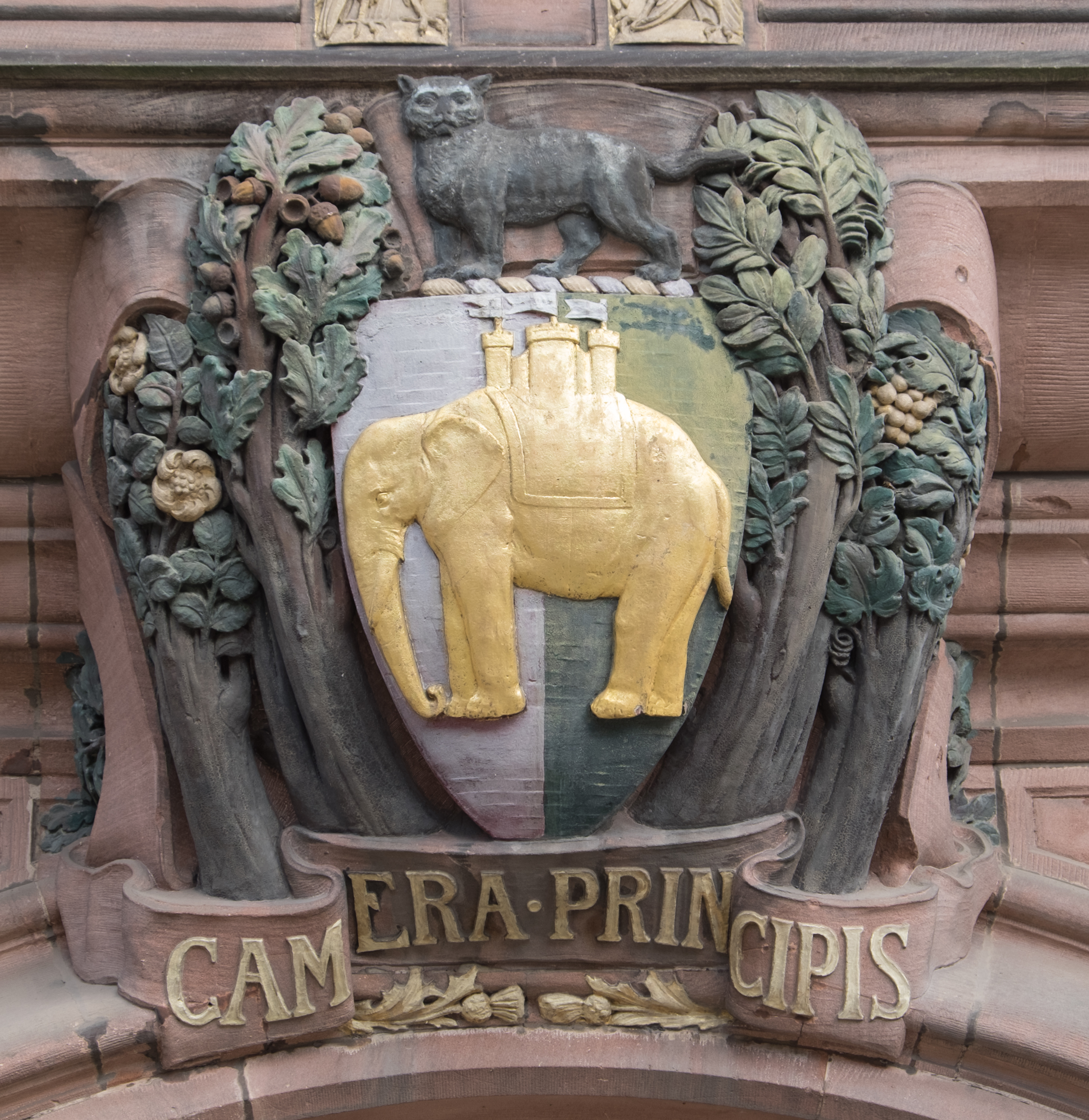
The coat of arms of Coventry over the entrance to the Council House. Coventry's motto Camera Principis translates as "The Prince's Chamber", used because Coventry was regarded as the chamber of Edward, the Black Prince.

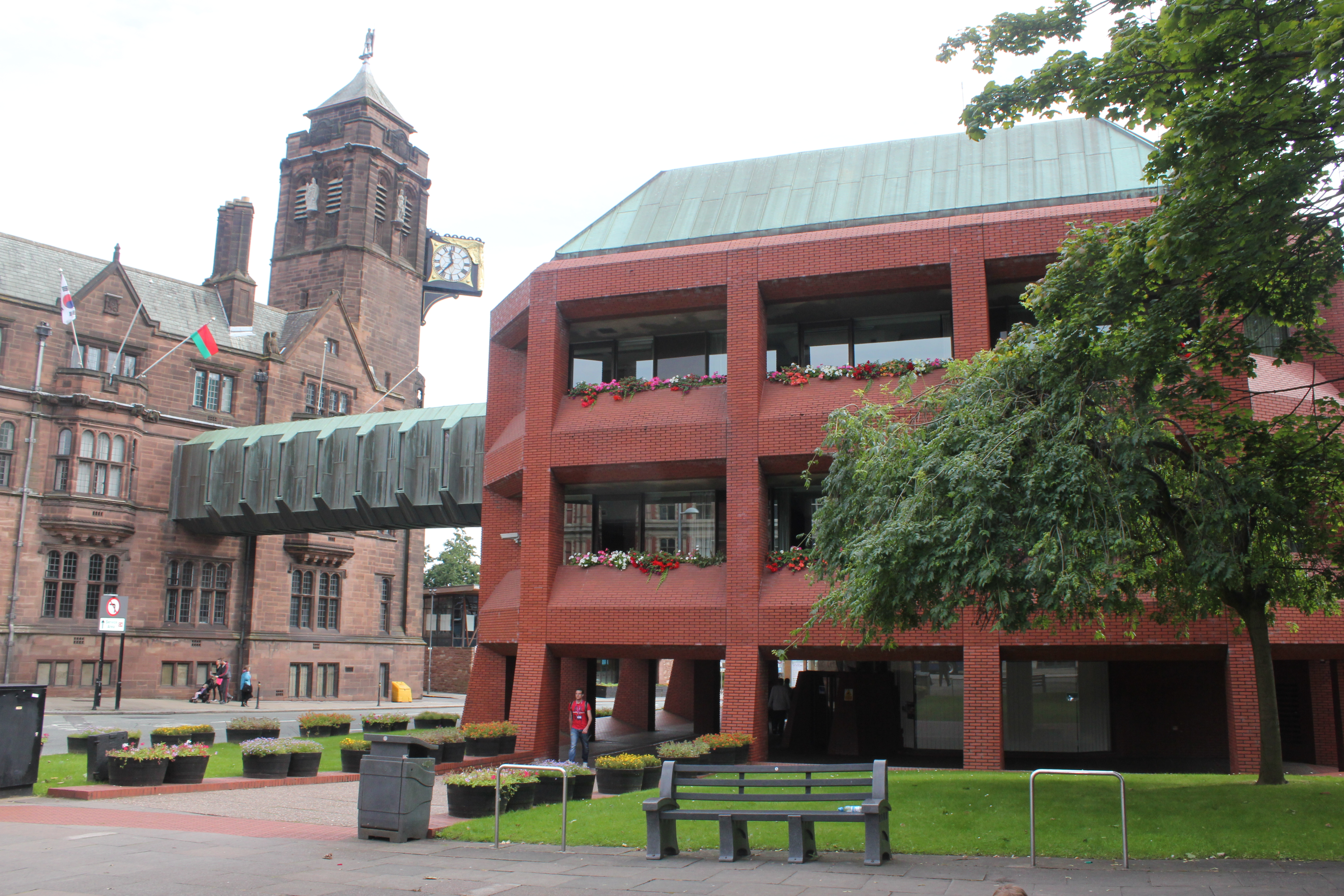
The former bridge link to 'Civic Centre 3'
