= Birmingham Blue Coat School =

The Blue Coat School Birmingham Limited

Location
- Somerset Road; Birmingham, West Midlands, B17 0HR; England; 52.460435°N 1.94013°W

Information
- Type: Private School
- Motto: Grow In Grace
- Religious affiliation: Church of England
- Established: 16 November 1722; 303 years ago
- Department for Education URN: 103580 Tables
- Headmaster: Noel Neeson
- Second Master: Robert Newman
- Gender: Co-educational
- Age: 3 to 11
- Enrolment: c. 700
- Website: www.thebluecoatschool.com

The Blue Coat School is a preparatory school in Birmingham, England for children aged 3 to 11. It has 15 acres of gardens and playing fields. There are two sections to the school - Pre-Prep (including Nursery) and Prep. The school opened in November 1722, originally as a free boarding school for poor and orphaned children.

In 1930, the school moved from its original site next to St Philip's Church to its current site on Somerset Road. The following year, there were protests over proposals to construct an administrative building on the former site of the school, citing its value to the community.

== History ==
=== Creation ===
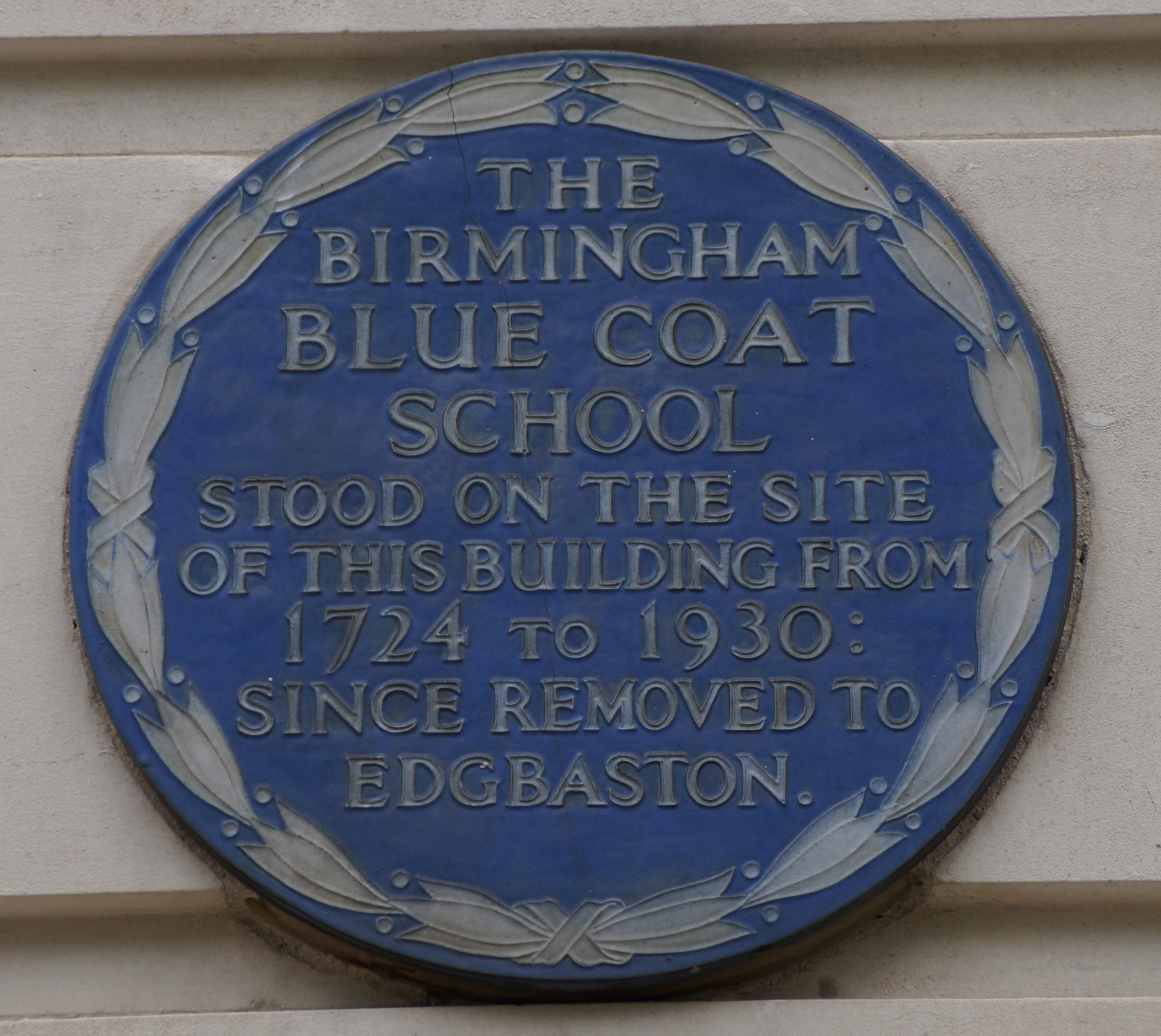
Blue plaque on the site of the original Blue Coat School

The school was founded on 16 November 1722 as a charity school under the guidance of Reverend William Higgs, Rector of St Philip's Church, now Birmingham Cathedral. At its outset, it provided food, clothing and education to 32 boys and 20 girls from poor families, aged between nine and 14. Construction of a plain brick building took place in 1724 and was significantly enlarged 70 years later in 1794, which included addition of the stone facade which is present today. Figures of a boy and a girl are placed at either side of the building, sculpted by Edward Grubb. Most of the children who were originally admitted were either orphans or who had lost a parent, with the school often assuming the role of guardian for those children. Records from 1884 showed an enrollment of 141 boys and 88 girls.

The school was originally located at 5 St Philip's Place (formerly the Prudential Assurance building). The old school site is now commemorated by a blue plaque. During its early history, many local people chose to bequeath property and assets to the school, the first person being Elizabeth White in 1722, who bequeathed 30 acres (12 ha) of land.

=== New building ===
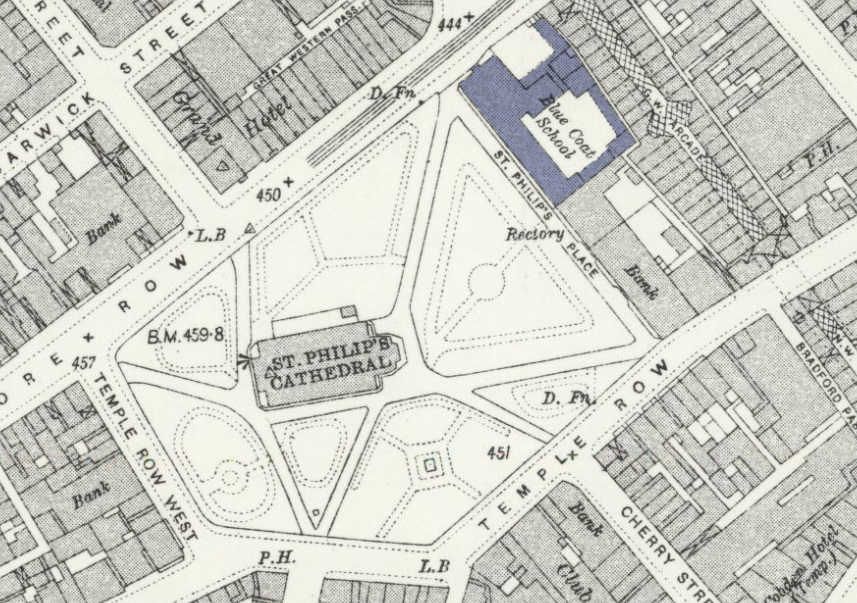
Blue Coat School on an Ordnance Survey map dated 1918

On 29 October 1930, the new school building was officially opened, having moved from the northeast corner of St. Philip's Square to new buildings designed by Henry Walter Simister at its current location on Somerset Road, on the border between Edgbaston and Harborne. At the time of the relocation, the school housed 108 boys and 82 girls. The freehold for the old site was acquired by the council in July 1927 for £121,000, with suggestions at the time that the building may be put to use as offices for corporation departments, who at that time were suffering with congestion at their existing accommodation. Shortly after the relocation, the old school building was housing some staff from the education department and it was hoped that any future plans would preserve the external appearance of the building, in particular the facade. The new 17 acres (6.9 ha) site cost £7,500, with children housed in self-contained hostels and a central building used for meal times.

In January 1931, the Lord Major Alderman Saunders received a letter from the secretary of the Birmingham and District Property Owners' Association in protest at the proposal to construct an administrative building on the former school site, noting that the site was "valuable" and that equally good alternate sites were available closer to the existing council house were departments where then based from. In 1939, it cost around £14,000 a year to educate, feed and house up to around 150 pupils.

=== Fee-paying proposals ===
Reports in 1954 suggested that the school was struggling for funds and was considering admitting fee-paying students. It was reported that school governors had closed two of the school's houses, a decision described as "scandalous" by local councillor Denis Howell, on advice of the Ministry of Education. The considerations towards allowing fee-paying students to enroll at the school was thought to be contrary to the original intentions of the founders, which was that the school would be freely available to the poor and orphans. There was discrepancies in what the school's budget deficit was, with the governing body reporting a shortfall of around £25,000 yet Councillor Howell believed it to be closer to £9,000.

=== 300th anniversary ===
In 2022, the school celebrated three hundred years since its founding with numerous events to mark the occasion. A time capsule was buried in front of the school chapel and a colourful mural of the school crest was unveiled, overlooking the main playground.

== Teachers ==
During the 1880s, the older boys were instructed in phonology by Marie Bethell Beauclerc, a pioneer in the teaching of shorthand.

Due to the sense of community the school has fostered (colloquially referred to as the 'Blue Coat family') many teachers have served for extended periods of time. As of 2025, there are teachers still working at Blue Coat whose first association with the school came in the 1990s and former Headmaster Alan Browning (retired 2016) taught at the school for over thirty years.

The current Headmaster took up the role in 2016 and has since overseen a period of expansion and modernisation.
