= Coventry Castle =

Former castle in England

- Coventry, England
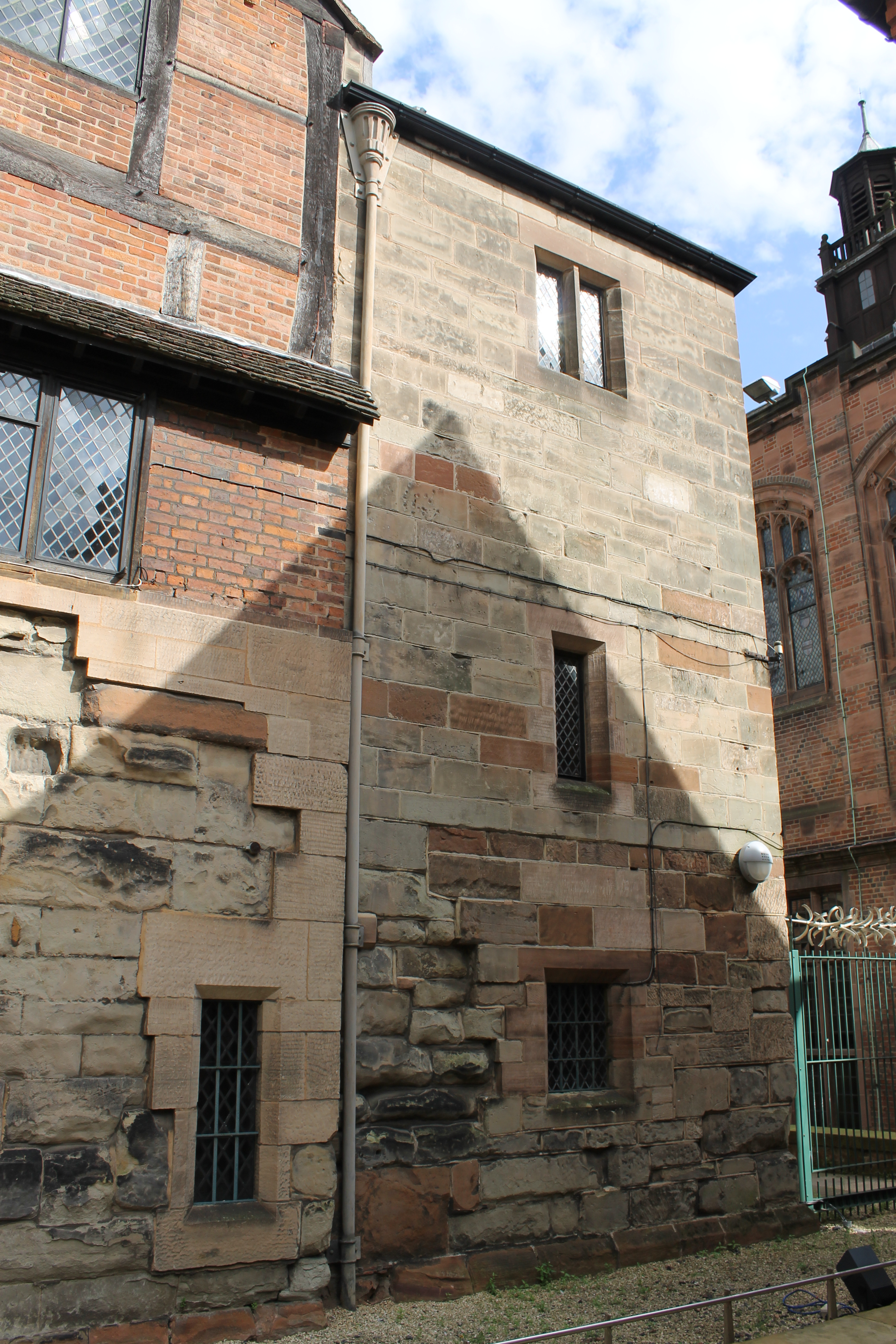
- Caesar's Tower, all that remains of the castle, and St Mary's Guildhall which was built onto the ruins.

Site information
- Type: Castle
- Open to the public: Yes
- Condition: Destroyed (apart from Caesar's Tower)

Location
- Map showing the location of Coventry Castle within the West Midlands
- Coordinates: 52.407442°N 1.507933°W

Site history
- Built: 11th century
- Demolished: Late 12th century

Coventry Castle (grid reference SP336788) was a motte and bailey castle in the city of Coventry, England. It was demolished in the late 12th century and St Mary's Guildhall was built on part of the site.

== History ==
=== Construction ===
It was built in the early 12th century by Ranulf de Gernon, 4th Earl of Chester. Its first known use was during The Anarchy when Robert Marmion, 1st Baron Marmion of Tamworth, a supporter of King Stephen, expelled the monks from the adjacent priory of Saint Mary and converted it into a fortress from which he waged a battle against the Earl. Marmion perished in the battle.

In 1147, those loyal to the king retreated to its defences during a siege by Ranulf de Gernon, 4th Earl of Chester whilst he tried to recapture the castle after he had handed the castle over to King Stephen. This was because whilst he was captured by the King in 1146 he was forced to give his castles over, although he only yielded a number of which Coventry was one. After the siege was lifted, King Stephen destroyed the castle, however it was probably later repaired as it was described as a viable fortification in 1182.

=== Tudor period ===
In November 1569, Mary, Queen of Scots was detained in Caesar's Tower, by which time St. Mary's Guildhall had been built onto it. The room in which she was detained is disputed. A room in Caesar's Tower nicknamed the "Mary Queen of Scots" was originally thought to be the location due to its cell-like appearance however it is likely she was held in the "Old Mayoress's Parlour".

=== Present day ===
Today, Caesar's Tower – which is thought to be all that remains of the castle – still exists as part of St Mary's Guildhall. It was rebuilt after bombing during the Second World War. On the bottom floor of the tower is "the Treasury", and above it is what is known (though, it is thought to be incorrectly) as the "Mary Queen of Scots room".

The Cathedral Lanes Shopping Centre was constructed over part of the castle.

== See also ==
- Warwick Castle
- Castles in Great Britain and Ireland
- List of castles in England
