= Ben Simister =

- Born: 22 June 1988 (age 38) St Helens, England
- Height: 6 ft 0 in (183 cm)
- Weight: 205 lb (93 kg; 14 st 9 lb)
- Position: Right wing
- Shot: Right
- NIHL team Former teams: Telford Tigers; Blackburn Hawks Deeside Dragons Widnes Wild
- Playing career: 2002–2017

Ben Simister (born 22 June 1988 in Liverpool, England) is a retired professional ice hockey player. Simister last played for the Telford Tigers in the English National Ice Hockey League.

Simister began his career in 2002 for the U16's Flintshire flames after having been Playing inline hockey for a number of years and always wanting to take up Ice hockey. After teaching himself to skate, and then play to a reasonable standard in the Flintshire freeze junior setup, he began to play for the Flintshire Freeze in the English National League.

Opportunities oversees in Europe and Canada pursuing hockey at camps, junior set ups and prep school programs, Simister spent numerous seasons playing AAA hockey before returning to the UK.

His first season was a consistent one, and in 20 games scored 8 goals and 14 assists as well as totalling 22 penalty minutes. He would start the following 2012/13 season as a newly branded Deeside Dragon part of the way into the season after arriving back late for the season from an extended training camp in Montreal, Canada. This season was another short season for Simister, and perhaps an under performing season for the forward registering 18 points in 19 games played.

The 2013–14 season would see Simister sign a contract with the new outfit Widnes Wild in the National Ice Hockey League Division 2 as the first ever club captain. Off to a great start to his new role, he recorded 12 points in 12 games before returning to the Deeside Dragons to finish off the season.

The Dragons Marginally Missed out on promotion finishing second in the league and losing the playoff/promotion playoff game against the Coventry Blaze. Simister recorded 13 games played, 9 goals and 7 assists as well as totalling 20 penalty minutes.

Following the 2013–14 season, Simister took a year out of Hockey to concentrate on his studies. Whilst studying, he decided to make the most of his year out of Hockey and enroll in the Dietetics programme at the University of Central Missouri in the United States of America.

Returning home for 2015/16 season with pre season preparation taken place in Montreal Canada, He was signed up by the 2014/15 League & Playoff champions Blackburn Hawks.

This season was to be Simister's most successful season to date. Recording 32 points in 32 regular season games, Plus recording 1 goals and 1 assist in the Playoff final game., The Blackburn Hawks were once again crowned League and Playoff champions.

With lots off adjustments and management changes at The Blackburn Hawks before the 2016/17 season, Simister Signed with Telford Tigers NIHL for the upcoming season along with his coach and number of Blackburn players. The 2016/2017 NIHL season with the telford tigers was not to be repeat of the previous year, as the tigers finished in last place at the end of the regular season. This was to be a very disappointing season for Simister as a couple months into the season he received a medial collateral ligament tear that resulted in missing more than 14 weeks of the seasons games. Never fully recovering from the injury, Simister finished off the season with 5 goals and 6 assists.

After the disappointing season in telford, Simister did not sign a contract with another team for 2017/2018 hockey season.

On May 16th 2024, Ben recorded his first Mentor Co-Ed Softball League win pitching for the Bad News Beers, throwing a complete game with 1 strikeout, winning 12-9.
