= Henry Walter Simister =

British architect

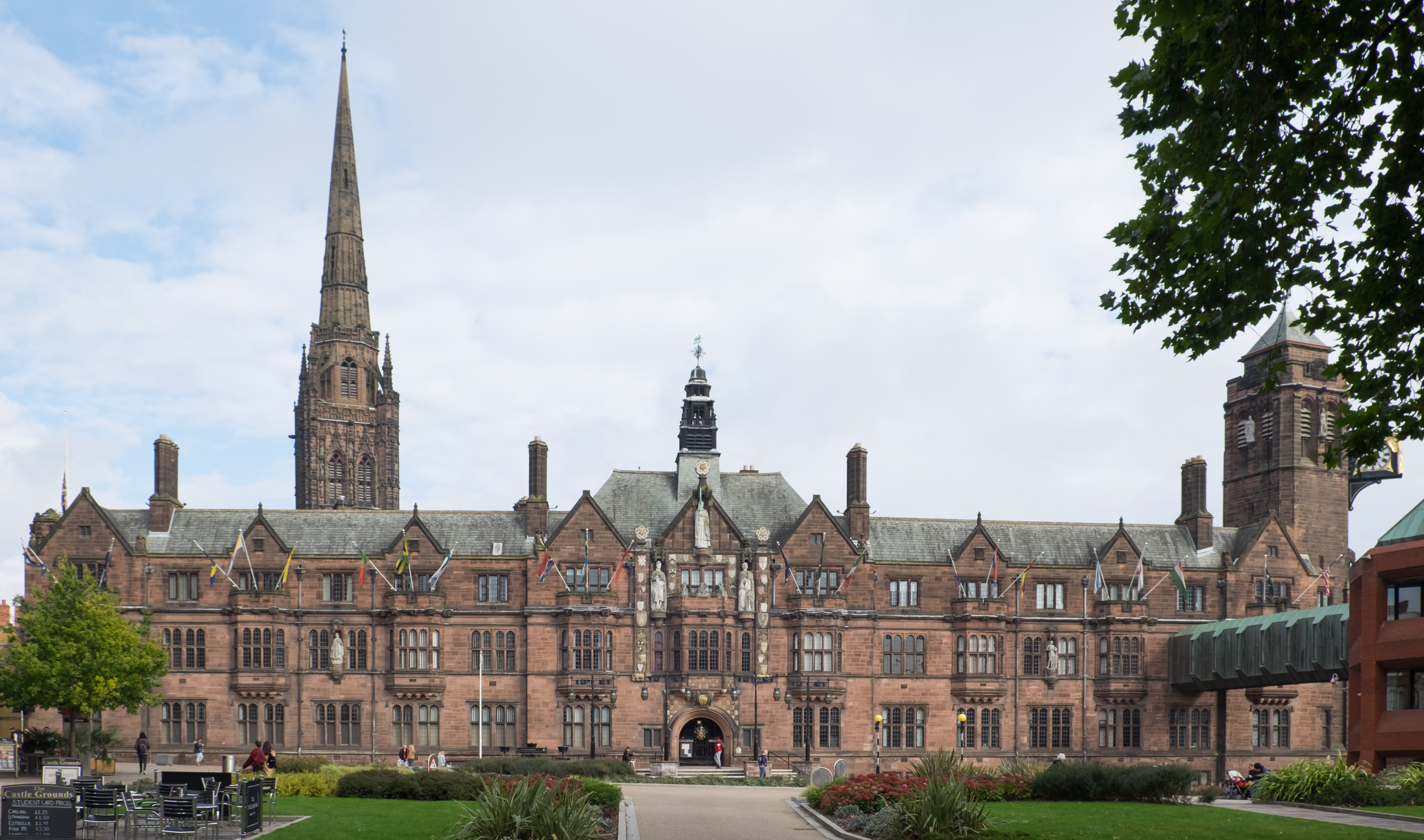
Council House, Coventry 1913-17

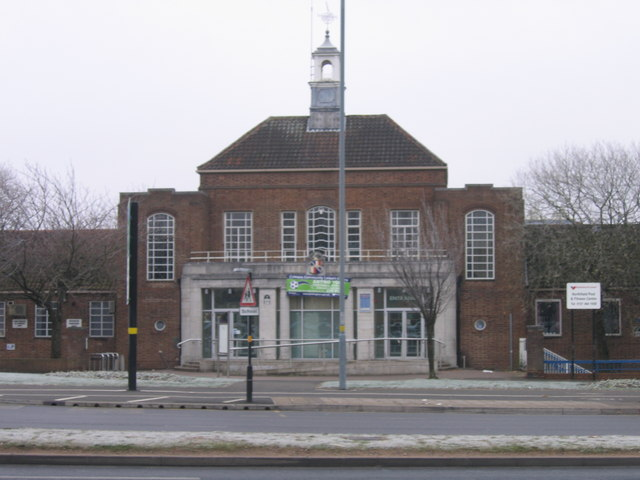
Northfield Baths 1937

Henry Walter Simister LRIBA (1881 - 21 December 1958) was a 20th-century architect based in Birmingham.

== History ==
He was born in 1881 in Staffordshire, the son of John Simmister (1855–1923) and Annie Harper (1854-1924).

He was articled to John Harry Woodall Hickton and Henry Edward Farmer of Walsall in 1898. He attended Birmingham School of Art. He was assistant to Herbert Tudor Buckland and Edward Haywood-Farmer.

In 1910 he started in independent practice in Birmingham in partnership with Edward Garratt (d. 1917). In 1911 he was appointed as LRIBA.

In 1905 he married Alice Emily Hill. This marriage produced the following children:

- John Walter Simister (1907–1919)
- Nellie Marjorie Simister (1908–1969)
- Alice Elizabeth Simister (1911–1971)

He died on 21 December 1958 and left an estate valued at £14,113 (equivalent to £287,400 in 2025).

== Works ==
- Council House, Coventry 1913-17
- Empress Theatre, The Strand, Bromsgrove, Worcestershire 1921-22.
- Victory Memorial Wing, Lichfield Soldiers' Home, Whittington Heath 1927
- Birmingham Blue Coat School 1929-30
- Chapel, Blue Coat School, Edgbaston, Birmingham 1932
- Trinity High School, Redditch 1930-32
- House, 6 The Firs, Coventry 1932
- House, 30 Avenue Road, Stratford-upon-Avon 1934
- Swimming Baths, Bristol Road, Northfield, Birmingham 1937
- New Cinema, Rubery, Birmingham 1939
